The Korean War (also known by other names) was fought between North Korea and South Korea from 1950 to 1953. The war began on 25 June 1950 when North Korea invaded South Korea following clashes along the border and rebellions in South Korea. North Korea was supported by China and the Soviet Union while South Korea was supported by the United States and allied countries. The fighting ended with an armistice on 27 July 1953.

In 1910, Imperial Japan annexed Korea, where it ruled for 35 years until its surrender at the end of World War II on 15 August 1945. The United States and the Soviet Union divided Korea along the 38th parallel into two zones of occupation. The Soviets administered the northern zone and the Americans administered the southern zone. In 1948, as a result of Cold War tensions, the occupation zones became two sovereign states. A socialist state, the Democratic People's Republic of Korea, was established in the north under the totalitarian communist leadership of Kim Il-sung, while a capitalist state, the Republic of Korea, was established in the south under the authoritarian, autocratic leadership of Syngman Rhee. Both governments of the two new Korean states claimed to be the sole legitimate government of all of Korea, and neither accepted the border as permanent.

North Korean military (Korean People's Army, KPA) forces crossed the border and drove into South Korea on 25 June 1950. Joseph Stalin had final decision power and several times demanded North Korea postpone the invasion, until he gave final approval in spring 1950. The United Nations Security Council denounced the North Korean move as an invasion and authorized the formation of the United Nations Command and the dispatch of forces to Korea to repel it. The Soviet Union was boycotting the UN for recognizing Taiwan (Republic of China) as China, and the People's Republic of China was not recognized by the UN, so neither could support their ally North Korea at the Security Council meeting. Twenty-one countries of the United Nations eventually contributed to the UN force, with the United States providing around 90% of the military personnel.

After the first two months of war, South Korean Army (ROKA) and hastily dispatched American forces were on the point of defeat, retreating to a small area behind a defensive line known as the Pusan Perimeter. In September 1950, a risky amphibious UN counteroffensive was launched at Incheon, cutting off KPA troops and supply lines in South Korea. Those who escaped envelopment and capture were forced back north. UN forces invaded North Korea in October 1950 and moved rapidly towards the Yalu River—the border with China—but on 19 October 1950, Chinese forces of the People's Volunteer Army (PVA) crossed the Yalu and entered the war. The UN retreated from North Korea after the First Phase Offensive and the Second Phase Offensive. Chinese forces were in South Korea by late December.

In these and subsequent battles, Seoul was captured four times, and communist forces were pushed back to positions around the 38th parallel, close to where the war had started. After this, the front stabilized, and the last two years were a war of attrition. The war in the air, however, was never a stalemate. North Korea was subject to a massive U.S. bombing campaign. Jet-powered fighters confronted each other in air-to-air combat for the first time in history, and Soviet pilots covertly flew in defense of their communist allies.

The fighting ended on 27 July 1953 when the Korean Armistice Agreement was signed. The agreement created the Korean Demilitarized Zone (DMZ) to separate North and South Korea, and allowed the return of prisoners. However, no peace treaty was ever signed, and the two Koreas are technically still at war, engaged in a frozen conflict. In April 2018, the leaders of North and South Korea met at the DMZ and agreed to work toward a treaty to end the Korean War formally.

The Korean War was among the most destructive conflicts of the modern era, with approximately 3 million war fatalities and a larger proportional civilian death toll than World War II or the Vietnam War. It incurred the destruction of virtually all of Korea's major cities, thousands of massacres by both sides, including the mass killing of tens of thousands of suspected communists by the South Korean government, and the torture and starvation of prisoners of war by the North Koreans. North Korea became among the most heavily bombed countries in history. 1.5 million North Koreans are estimated to have fled North Korea over the course of the war.

Names

In South Korea, the war is usually referred to as the "625 War", the "625 Upheaval", or simply "625", reflecting the date of its commencement on 25 June.

In North Korea, the war is officially referred to as the "Fatherland Liberation War" or alternatively the "Chosŏn [Korean] War".

In mainland China, the segment of the war after the intervention of the People's Volunteer Army is most commonly and officially known as the "Resisting America and Assisting Korea War", although the term "Chosŏn War" is sometimes used unofficially. The term "Hán (Korean) War" is most commonly used in Taiwan (Republic of China), Hong Kong and Macau.

In the U.S., the war was initially described by President Harry S. Truman as a "police action", as the United States never formally declared war on its opponents and the operation was conducted under the auspices of the United Nations. It has been sometimes referred to in the English-speaking world as "The Forgotten War" or "The Unknown War" because of the lack of public attention it received both during and after the war, relative to the global scale of World War II, which preceded it, and the subsequent angst of the Vietnam War, which succeeded it.

Background

Imperial Japanese rule (1910–1945)

Imperial Japan severely diminished the influence of China over Korea in the First Sino-Japanese War (1894–95), ushering in the short-lived Korean Empire. A decade later, after defeating Imperial Russia in the Russo-Japanese War (1904–05), Japan made the Korean Empire its protectorate with the Eulsa Treaty in 1905, then annexed it with the Japan–Korea Annexation Treaty in 1910. After that, the Korean Empire fell and Korea was directly ruled by Japan from 1910 to 1945.

Many Korean nationalists fled the country. The Provisional Government of the Republic of Korea was founded in 1919 in Nationalist China. It failed to achieve international recognition, failed to unite the various nationalist groups, and had a fractious relationship with its U.S.-based founding president, Syngman Rhee. From 1919 to 1925 and beyond, Korean communists led internal and external warfare against the Japanese.

In China, the nationalist National Revolutionary Army and the communist People's Liberation Army (PLA) helped organize Korean refugees against the Japanese military, which had also occupied parts of China. The Nationalist-backed Koreans, led by Yi Pom-Sok, fought in the Burma Campaign (December 1941 – August 1945). The communists, led among others by Kim Il-sung, fought the Japanese in Korea and Manchuria.

At the Cairo Conference in November 1943, China, the United Kingdom and the United States all decided that "in due course Korea shall become free and independent".

Korea divided (1945–1949)

At the Tehran Conference in November 1943 and the Yalta Conference in February 1945, the Soviet Union promised to join its allies in the Pacific War within three months of the victory in Europe. Germany officially surrendered on 8 May 1945, and the USSR declared war on Japan and invaded Manchuria on 8 August 1945, three months later. This was three days after the atomic bombing of Hiroshima. By 10 August, the Red Army had begun to occupy the north of Korea.

On the night of 10 August in Washington, U.S. Colonels Dean Rusk and Charles H. Bonesteel III were assigned to divide Korea into Soviet and U.S. occupation zones and proposed the 38th Parallel as the dividing line. This was incorporated into the U.S. General Order No. 1, which responded to the Japanese surrender on 15 August. Explaining the choice of the 38th Parallel, Rusk observed, "even though it was further north than could be realistically reached by U. S. [sic] forces in the event of Soviet disagreement ... we felt it important to include the capital of Korea in the area of responsibility of American troops". He noted that he was "faced with the scarcity of U.S. forces immediately available and time and space factors which would make it difficult to reach very far north before Soviet troops could enter the area". As Rusk's comments indicate, the U.S. doubted whether the Soviet government would agree to this. Soviet leader Joseph Stalin, however, maintained his wartime policy of co-operation, and on 16 August, the Red Army halted at the 38th Parallel for three weeks to await the arrival of U.S. forces in the south.

On 7 September 1945, General Douglas MacArthur issued Proclamation No. 1 to the people of Korea, announcing U.S. military control over Korea south of the 38th parallel and establishing English as the official language during military control.

On 8 September 1945, U.S. Lieutenant General John R. Hodge arrived in Incheon to accept the Japanese surrender south of the 38th Parallel. Appointed as military governor, Hodge directly controlled South Korea as head of the United States Army Military Government in Korea (USAMGIK 1945–48).

In December 1945, Korea was administered by a U.S.–Soviet Union Joint Commission, as agreed at the Moscow Conference, with the aim of granting independence after a five-year trusteeship. The idea was not popular among Koreans and riots broke out. To contain them, the USAMGIK banned strikes on 8 December 1945 and outlawed the PRK Revolutionary Government and the PRK People's Committees on 12 December 1945. Following further large-scale civilian unrest, the USAMGIK declared martial law.

Citing the inability of the Joint Commission to make progress, the U.S. government decided to hold an election under United Nations auspices with the aim of creating an independent Korea. The Soviet authorities and the Korean Communists refused to co-operate on the grounds that it would not be fair, and many South Korean politicians boycotted it. A general election was held in the South on 10 May 1948. North Korea held parliamentary elections three months later on 25 August.

The resultant South Korean government promulgated a national political constitution on 17 July 1948, and elected Syngman Rhee as President on 20 July 1948. This election is generally considered to have been manipulated by the Rhee regime. The Republic of Korea (South Korea) was established on 15 August 1948. In the Soviet Korean Zone of Occupation, the Soviet Union agreed to the establishment of a communist government led by Kim Il-sung.

The Soviet Union withdrew its forces from Korea in 1948, and U.S. troops withdrew in 1949.

Chinese Civil War (1945–1949)

With the end of the war with Japan, the Chinese Civil War resumed in earnest between the Communists and Nationalists. While the Communists were struggling for supremacy in Manchuria, they were supported by the North Korean government with matériel and manpower. According to Chinese sources, the North Koreans donated 2,000 railway cars worth of supplies while thousands of Koreans served in the Chinese PLA during the war. North Korea also provided the Chinese Communists in Manchuria with a safe refuge for non-combatants and communications with the rest of China.

The North Korean contributions to the Chinese Communist victory were not forgotten after the creation of the People's Republic of China (PRC) in 1949. As a token of gratitude, between 50,000 and 70,000 Korean veterans that served in the PLA were sent back along with their weapons, and they later played a significant role in the initial invasion of South Korea. China promised to support the North Koreans in the event of a war against South Korea.

After the formation of the PRC, the PRC government named the Western nations, led by the U.S., as the biggest threat to its national security. Basing this judgment on multiple factors, including the idea of a Chinese century of humiliation at the hands of Western powers beginning in the mid-19th century, U.S. support for the Nationalists during the Chinese Civil War, and the ideological struggles between revolutionaries and reactionaries, the PRC Chinese leadership believed that China would become a critical battleground in the U.S.' crusade against Communism. As a countermeasure and to elevate China's standing among the worldwide Communist movements, the PRC leadership adopted a foreign policy that actively promoted Communist revolutions throughout territories on China's periphery.

Communist insurgency in South Korea (1948–1950)
By 1948, a large-scale, North Korea-backed insurgency had broken out in the southern half of the peninsula. This was exacerbated by the ongoing undeclared border war between the Koreas, which saw division-level engagements and thousands of deaths on both sides. The ROK in this time was almost entirely trained and focused on counterinsurgency, rather than conventional warfare. They were equipped and advised by a force of a few hundred American officers, who were largely successful in helping the ROKA to subdue guerrillas and hold its own against North Korean military (Korean People's Army, KPA) forces along the 38th parallel. Approximately 8,000 South Korean soldiers and police died in the insurgent war and border clashes.

The first socialist uprising occurred without direct North Korean participation, though the guerrillas still professed support for the northern government. Beginning in April 1948 on the isolated island of Jeju, the campaign saw mass arrests and repression by the South Korean government in the fight against the South Korean Labor Party, resulting in a total of 30,000 violent deaths, among them 14,373 civilians (of whom ~2,000 were killed by rebels and ~12,000 by ROK security forces). The Yeosu–Suncheon rebellion overlapped with it, as several thousand army defectors waving red flags massacred right-leaning families. This resulted in another brutal suppression by the government and between 2,976 and 3,392 deaths. By May 1949, both uprisings had been crushed.

Insurgency reignited in the spring of 1949 when attacks by guerrillas in the mountainous regions (buttressed by army defectors and North Korean agents) increased. Insurgent activity peaked in late 1949 as the ROKA engaged so-called People's Guerrilla Units. Organized and armed by the North Korean government, and backed up by 2,400 KPA commandos who had infiltrated through the border, these guerrillas launched a large offensive in September aimed at undermining the South Korean government and preparing the country for the KPA's arrival in force. This offensive failed. However, by this point, the guerrillas were firmly entrenched in the Taebaek-san region of the North Gyeongsang Province (around Taegu), as well as in the border areas of the Gangwon Province.

While the insurgency was ongoing, the ROKA and KPA engaged in multiple battalion-sized battles along the border, starting in May 1949. Serious border clashes between South and North continued on 4 August 1949, when thousands of North Korean troops attacked South Korean troops occupying territory north of the 38th Parallel. The 2nd and 18th ROK Infantry Regiments repulsed initial attacks in Kuksa-bong (above the 38th Parallel) and Ch'ungmu, and at the end of the clashes ROK troops were "completely routed". Border incidents decreased significantly by the start of 1950.

Meanwhile, counterinsurgency efforts in the South Korean interior intensified; persistent operations, paired with worsening weather conditions, eventually denied the guerrillas sanctuary and wore away their fighting strength. North Korea responded by sending more troops to link up with existing insurgents and build more partisan cadres; the number of North Korean infiltrators had reached 3,000 soldiers in 12 units by the start of 1950, but all of these units were destroyed or scattered by the ROKA. On 1 October 1949, the ROKA launched a three-pronged assault on the insurgents in South Cholla and Taegu. By March 1950, the ROKA claimed 5,621 guerrillas killed or captured and 1,066 small arms seized. This operation crippled the insurgency. Soon after, the North Koreans made two final attempts to keep the uprising active, sending two battalion-sized units of infiltrators under the commands of Kim Sang-ho and Kim Moo-hyon. The first battalion was reduced in annihilation to a single man over the course of several engagements by the ROKA 8th Division. The second battalion was annihilated by a two-battalion hammer-and-anvil maneuver by units of the ROKA 6th Division, resulting in a loss toll of 584 KPA guerrillas (480 killed, 104 captured) and 69 ROKA troops killed, plus 184 wounded. By spring of 1950, guerrilla activity had mostly subsided; the border, too, was calm.

Prelude to war (1950)
By 1949, South Korean and U.S. military actions had reduced the active number of indigenous communist guerrillas in the South from 5,000 to 1,000. However, Kim Il-sung believed that widespread uprisings had weakened the South Korean military and that a North Korean invasion would be welcomed by much of the South Korean population. Kim began seeking Stalin's support for an invasion in March 1949, traveling to Moscow to attempt to persuade him.

Stalin initially did not think the time was right for a war in Korea. PLA forces were still embroiled in the Chinese Civil War, while U.S. forces remained stationed in South Korea. By spring 1950, he believed that the strategic situation had changed: PLA forces under Mao Zedong had secured final victory in China, U.S. forces had withdrawn from Korea, and the Soviets had detonated their first nuclear bomb, breaking the U.S. atomic monopoly. As the U.S. had not directly intervened to stop the communist victory in China, Stalin calculated that they would be even less willing to fight in Korea, which had much less strategic significance. The Soviets had also cracked the codes used by the U.S. to communicate with their embassy in Moscow, and reading these dispatches convinced Stalin that Korea did not have the importance to the U.S. that would warrant a nuclear confrontation. Stalin began a more aggressive strategy in Asia based on these developments, including promising economic and military aid to China through the Sino-Soviet Treaty of Friendship, Alliance, and Mutual Assistance.

In April 1950, Stalin gave Kim permission to attack the government in the South under the condition that Mao would agree to send reinforcements if needed. For Kim, this was the fulfillment of his goal to unite Korea after its division by foreign powers. Stalin made it clear that Soviet forces would not openly engage in combat, to avoid a direct war with the U.S. Kim met with Mao in May 1950. Historical analyses regarding Mao's approval of Kim's plans differ. Nikita Khrushchev's memoirs were long viewed as the most authoritative source, and Khrushchev wrote that Mao approved Kim's plans because Mao viewed the matter as one for the Korean people to decide for themselves. Citing recent scholarship, Zhao Suisheng, writing in 2022, contends that Mao did not approve of Kim's plans in advance, opposing them over concerns that the U.S. would intervene and that China could be dragged into the conflict. By some accounts, Mao agreed to support the North Korean invasion despite these concerns, as China desperately needed the economic and military aid promised by the Soviets. However, Mao sent more ethnic Korean PLA veterans to Korea and promised to move an army closer to the Korean border. Once Mao's commitment was secured, preparations for war accelerated. 

Soviet generals with extensive combat experience from the Second World War were sent to North Korea as the Soviet Advisory Group. These generals completed the plans for the attack by May. The original plans called for a skirmish to be initiated in the Ongjin Peninsula on the west coast of Korea. The North Koreans would then launch a counterattack that would capture Seoul and encircle and destroy the ROK. The final stage would involve destroying South Korean government remnants and capturing the rest of South Korea, including the ports.

On 7 June 1950, Kim Il-sung called for a Korea-wide election on 5–8 August 1950 and a consultative conference in Haeju on 15–17 June 1950. On 11 June, the North sent three diplomats to the South as a peace overture which Rhee rejected outright. On 21 June, Kim Il-Sung revised his war plan to involve a general attack across the 38th Parallel, rather than a limited operation in the Ongjin Peninsula. Kim was concerned that South Korean agents had learned about the plans and that South Korean forces were strengthening their defenses. Stalin agreed to this change of plan.

While these preparations were underway in the North, there were frequent clashes along the 38th Parallel, especially at Kaesong and Ongjin, many initiated by the South. The ROK was being trained by the U.S. Korean Military Advisory Group (KMAG). On the eve of war, KMAG commander General William Lynn Roberts voiced utmost confidence in the ROK and boasted that any North Korean invasion would merely provide "target practice". For his part, Syngman Rhee repeatedly expressed his desire to conquer the North, including when U.S. diplomat John Foster Dulles visited Korea on 18 June.

Although some South Korean and U.S. intelligence officers predicted an attack from the North, similar predictions had been made before and nothing had happened. The Central Intelligence Agency noted the southward movement by the KPA, but assessed this as a "defensive measure" and concluded an invasion was "unlikely". On 23 June, UN observers inspected the border and did not detect that war was imminent.

Comparison of forces
Throughout 1949 and 1950, the Soviets continued arming North Korea. After the Communist victory in the Chinese Civil War, ethnic Korean units in the PLA were sent to North Korea. Chinese involvement was extensive from the beginning, building on previous collaboration between the Chinese and Korean communists during the Chinese Civil War. In the fall of 1949, two PLA divisions composed mainly of Korean-Chinese troops (the 164th and 166th) entered North Korea, followed by smaller units throughout the rest of 1949; these troops brought with them not only their experience and training, but also their weapons and other equipment, changing little but their uniforms. The reinforcement of the KPA with PLA veterans continued into 1950, with the 156th Division and several other units of the former Fourth Field Army arriving (also with their equipment) in February; the PLA 156th Division was reorganized as the KPA 7th Division. By mid-1950, between 50,000 and 70,000 former PLA troops had entered North Korea, forming a significant part of the KPA's strength on the eve of the war's beginning. Several generals, such as Lee Kwon-mu, were PLA veterans born to ethnic Koreans in China. The combat veterans and equipment from China, the tanks, artillery and aircraft supplied by the Soviets, and rigorous training increased North Korea's military superiority over the South, armed by the U.S. military with mostly small arms, but no heavy weaponry such as tanks. While older histories of the conflict often referred to these ethnic Korean PLA veterans as being sent from northern Korea to fight in the Chinese Civil War before being sent back, recent Chinese archival sources studied by Kim Donggill indicate that this was not the case. Rather, the soldiers were indigenous to China (part of China's longstanding ethnic Korean community) and were recruited to the PLA in the same way as any other Chinese citizen.

According to the first official census in 1949, the population of North Korea numbered 9,620,000, and by mid-1950, North Korean forces numbered between 150,000 and 200,000 troops, organized into 10 infantry divisions, one tank division, and one air force division, with 210 fighter planes and 280 tanks, who captured scheduled objectives and territory, among them Kaesong, Chuncheon, Uijeongbu and Ongjin. Their forces included 274 T-34-85 tanks, 200 artillery pieces, 110 attack bombers, and some 150 Yak fighter planes, and 35 reconnaissance aircraft. In addition to the invasion force, the North had 114 fighters, 78 bombers, 105 T-34-85 tanks, and some 30,000 soldiers stationed in reserve in North Korea. Although each navy consisted of only several small warships, the North and South Korean navies fought in the war as seaborne artillery for their armies.

In contrast, the South Korean population was estimated at 20 million and its army was unprepared and ill-equipped.  As of 25 June 1950, the ROK had 98,000 soldiers (65,000 combat, 33,000 support), no tanks (they had been requested from the U.S. military, but requests were denied), and a 22-plane air force comprising 12 liaison-type and 10 AT-6 advanced-trainer airplanes. Large U.S. garrisons and air forces were in Japan, but only 200–300 U.S. troops were in Korea.

Course of the war

At dawn on Sunday, 25 June 1950, the KPA crossed the 38th Parallel behind artillery fire. The KPA justified its assault with the claim that ROK troops attacked first and that the KPA were aiming to arrest and execute the "bandit traitor Syngman Rhee". Fighting began on the strategic Ongjin Peninsula in the west. There were initial South Korean claims that the 17th Regiment captured the city of Haeju, and this sequence of events has led some scholars to argue that the South Koreans fired first.

Whoever fired the first shots in Ongjin, KPA forces attacked all along the 38th Parallel within an hour. The KPA had a combined arms force including tanks supported by heavy artillery. The ROK had no tanks, anti-tank weapons or heavy artillery to stop such an attack. In addition, the South Koreans committed their forces in a piecemeal fashion and these were routed in a few days.

On 27 June, Rhee evacuated from Seoul with some of the government. On 28 June, at 2 am, the ROK blew up the Hangang Bridge across the Han River in an attempt to stop the KPA. The bridge was detonated while 4,000 refugees were crossing it and hundreds were killed. Destroying the bridge also trapped many ROK units north of the Han River. In spite of such desperate measures, Seoul fell that same day. A number of South Korean National Assemblymen remained in Seoul when it fell, and forty-eight subsequently pledged allegiance to the North.

On 28 June, Rhee ordered the massacre of suspected political opponents in his own country.

In five days, the ROK, which had 95,000 troops on 25 June, was down to less than 22,000 troops. In early July, when U.S. forces arrived, what was left of the ROK were placed under U.S. operational command of the United Nations Command.

Factors in U.S. intervention
The Truman administration was unprepared for the invasion. Korea was not included in the strategic Asian Defense Perimeter outlined by United States Secretary of State Dean Acheson. Truman himself was at his home in Independence, Missouri. Military strategists were more concerned with the security of Europe against the Soviet Union than East Asia. At the same time, the administration was worried that a war in Korea could quickly escalate without American intervention. Said diplomat John Foster Dulles in a cable: "To sit by while Korea is overrun by unprovoked armed attack would start a disastrous chain of events leading most probably to world war."

While there was initial hesitance by some in the U.S. government to get involved in the war, considerations about Japan played a part in the ultimate decision to engage on behalf of South Korea. Especially after the fall of China to the Communists, U.S. experts on East Asia saw Japan as the critical counterweight to the Soviet Union and China in the region. While there was no U.S. policy dealing with South Korea directly as a national interest, its proximity to Japan increased the importance of South Korea. Said Kim: "The recognition that the security of Japan required a non-hostile Korea led directly to President Truman's decision to intervene ... The essential point ... is that the American response to the North Korean attack stemmed from considerations of U.S. policy toward Japan."

Another major consideration was the possible Soviet reaction if the U.S. intervened. The Truman administration was fearful that a war in Korea was a diversionary assault that would escalate to a general war in Europe once the United States committed in Korea. At the same time, "[t]here was no suggestion from anyone that the United Nations or the United States could back away from [the conflict]". Yugoslavia—a possible Soviet target because of the Tito-Stalin Split—was vital to the defense of Italy and Greece, and the country was first on the list of the National Security Council's post-North Korea invasion list of "chief danger spots". Truman believed if aggression went unchecked, a chain reaction would be initiated that would marginalize the UN and encourage Communist aggression elsewhere. The UN Security Council approved the use of force to help the South Koreans, and the U.S. immediately began using air and naval forces that were in the area to that end. The Truman administration still refrained from committing troops on the ground because some advisers believed the North Koreans could be stopped by air and naval power alone.

The Truman administration was still uncertain if the attack was a ploy by the Soviet Union or just a test of U.S. resolve. The decision to commit ground troops became viable when a communiqué was received on 27 June indicating the Soviet Union would not move against U.S. forces in Korea. The Truman administration now believed it could intervene in Korea without undermining its commitments elsewhere.

United Nations Security Council Resolutions

On 25 June 1950, the United Nations Security Council unanimously condemned the North Korean invasion of South Korea, with UN Security Council Resolution 82. The Soviet Union, a veto-wielding power, had boycotted the Council meetings since January 1950, protesting Taiwan's occupation of China's permanent seat in the UN Security Council. After debating the matter, the Security Council, on 27 June 1950, published Resolution 83 recommending member states provide military assistance to the Republic of Korea. On 27 June, President Truman ordered U.S. air and sea forces to help South Korea. On 4 July, the Soviet Deputy Foreign Minister accused the U.S. of starting armed intervention on behalf of South Korea.

The Soviet Union challenged the legitimacy of the war for several reasons. The ROK intelligence upon which Resolution 83 was based came from U.S. Intelligence; North Korea was not invited as a sitting temporary member of the UN, which violated UN Charter Article 32; and the fighting was beyond the UN Charter's scope, because the initial north–south border fighting was classed as a civil war. Because the Soviet Union was boycotting the Security Council at the time, legal scholars posited that deciding upon an action of this type required the unanimous vote of all the five permanent members including the Soviet Union.

Within days of the invasion, masses of ROK soldiers—of dubious loyalty to the Syngman Rhee regime—were retreating southwards or defecting en masse to the northern side, the KPA.

United States' response (July–August 1950)

As soon as word of the attack was received, Acheson informed President Truman that the North Koreans had invaded South Korea. Truman and Acheson discussed a U.S. invasion response and agreed that the U.S. was obligated to act, comparing the North Korean invasion with Adolf Hitler's aggressions in the 1930s, with the conclusion being that the mistake of appeasement must not be repeated. Several U.S. industries were mobilized to supply materials, labor, capital, production facilities, and other services necessary to support the military objectives of the Korean War. President Truman later explained that he believed fighting the invasion was essential to the U.S. goal of the global containment of communism as outlined in the National Security Council Report 68 (NSC 68) (declassified in 1975):

In August 1950, the President and the Secretary of State obtained the consent of Congress to appropriate $12 billion for military action in Korea.

Because of the extensive defense cuts and the emphasis placed on building a nuclear bomber force, none of the services were in a position to make a robust response with conventional military strength. General Omar Bradley, Chairman of the Joint Chiefs of Staff, was faced with reorganizing and deploying a U.S. military force that was a shadow of its World War II counterpart.

Acting on Secretary of State Acheson's recommendation, President Truman ordered Supreme Commander for the Allied Powers in Japan General Douglas MacArthur to transfer matériel to the South Korean military while giving air cover to the evacuation of U.S. nationals. The President disagreed with advisers who recommended unilateral U.S. bombing of the North Korean forces and ordered the U.S. Seventh Fleet to protect the Republic of China (Taiwan), whose government asked to fight in Korea. The United States denied Taiwan's request for combat, lest it provoke a PRC retaliation. Because the United States had sent the Seventh Fleet to "neutralize" the Taiwan Strait, Chinese premier Zhou Enlai criticized both the UN and U.S. initiatives as "armed aggression on Chinese territory".

The drive south and Pusan (July–September 1950)

The Battle of Osan, the first significant U.S. engagement of the Korean War, involved the 540-soldier Task Force Smith, which was a small forward element of the 24th Infantry Division which had been flown in from Japan. On 5 July 1950, Task Force Smith attacked the KPA at Osan but without weapons capable of destroying the KPA tanks. The KPA defeated the U.S. soldiers; the result was 180 American dead, wounded, or taken prisoner. The KPA progressed southwards, pushing back U.S. forces at Pyongtaek, Chonan, and Chochiwon, forcing the 24th Division's retreat to Taejeon, which the KPA captured in the Battle of Taejon; the 24th Division suffered 3,602 dead and wounded and 2,962 captured, including its commander, Major General William F. Dean.

By August, the KPA steadily pushed back the ROK and the Eighth United States Army southwards. The impact of the Truman administration's defense budget cutbacks was now keenly felt, as U.S. troops fought a series of costly rearguard actions. Facing a veteran and well-led KPA force, and lacking sufficient anti-tank weapons, artillery or armor, the Americans retreated and the KPA advanced down the Korean Peninsula. During their advance, the KPA purged South Korea's intelligentsia by killing civil servants and intellectuals. On 20 August, General MacArthur warned North Korean leader Kim Il-sung that he would be held responsible for the KPA's atrocities. By September, UN forces were hemmed into a small corner of southeast Korea, near Pusan. This  perimeter enclosed about 10% of Korea, in a line partially defined by the Nakdong River.

Although Kim's early successes led him to predict he would end the war by the end of August, Chinese leaders were more pessimistic. To counter a possible U.S. deployment, Zhou Enlai secured a Soviet commitment to have the Soviet Union support Chinese forces with air cover, and deployed 260,000 soldiers along the Korean border, under the command of Gao Gang. Zhou commanded Chai Chengwen to conduct a topographical survey of Korea, and directed Lei Yingfu, Zhou's military advisor in Korea, to analyze the military situation in Korea. Lei concluded that MacArthur would most likely attempt a landing at Incheon. After conferring with Mao that this would be MacArthur's most likely strategy, Zhou briefed Soviet and North Korean advisers of Lei's findings, and issued orders to PLA commanders deployed on the Korean border to prepare for U.S. naval activity in the Korea Strait.

In the resulting Battle of Pusan Perimeter (August–September 1950), the UN forces withstood KPA attacks meant to capture the city at the Naktong Bulge, P'ohang-dong, and Taegu. The United States Air Force (USAF) interrupted KPA logistics with 40 daily ground support sorties, which destroyed 32 bridges, halting most daytime road and rail traffic. KPA forces were forced to hide in tunnels by day and move only at night. To deny military equipment and supplies to the KPA, the USAF destroyed logistics depots, petroleum refineries, and harbors, while the U.S. Navy air forces attacked transport hubs. Consequently, the overextended KPA could not be supplied throughout the south. On 27 August, 67th Fighter Squadron aircraft mistakenly attacked facilities in Chinese territory and the Soviet Union called the UN Security Council's attention to China's complaint about the incident. The U.S. proposed that a commission of India and Sweden determine what the U.S. should pay in compensation, but the Soviets vetoed the U.S. proposal.

Meanwhile, U.S. garrisons in Japan continually dispatched soldiers and military supplies to reinforce defenders in the Pusan Perimeter. Tank battalions deployed to Korea directly from the U.S. mainland from the port of San Francisco to the port of Pusan, the largest Korean port. By late August, the Pusan Perimeter had some 500 medium tanks battle-ready. In early September 1950, UN forces outnumbered the KPA 180,000 to 100,000 soldiers.

Battle of Incheon (September 1950)

Against the rested and rearmed Pusan Perimeter defenders and their reinforcements, the KPA were undermanned and poorly supplied; unlike the UN forces, they lacked naval and air support. To relieve the Pusan Perimeter, General MacArthur recommended an amphibious landing at Incheon, near Seoul and well over  behind the KPA lines. On 6 July, he ordered Major General Hobart R. Gay, commander of the U.S. 1st Cavalry Division, to plan the division's amphibious landing at Incheon; on 12–14 July, the 1st Cavalry Division embarked from Yokohama, Japan, to reinforce the 24th Infantry Division inside the Pusan Perimeter.

Soon after the war began, General MacArthur began planning a landing at Incheon, but the Pentagon opposed him. When authorized, he activated a combined U.S. Army and Marine Corps, and ROK force. The U.S. X Corps, led by Major General Edward Almond, consisted of 40,000 soldiers of the 1st Marine Division, the 7th Infantry Division and around 8,600 ROK soldiers. By 15 September, the amphibious assault force faced few KPA defenders at Incheon: military intelligence, psychological warfare, guerrilla reconnaissance, and protracted bombardment facilitated a relatively light battle. However, the bombardment destroyed most of the city of Incheon.

Breakout from the Pusan Perimeter

On 16 September Eighth Army began its breakout from the Pusan Perimeter. Task Force Lynch, 3rd Battalion, 7th Cavalry Regiment, and two 70th Tank Battalion units (Charlie Company and the Intelligence–Reconnaissance Platoon) advanced through  of KPA territory to join the 7th Infantry Division at Osan on 27 September. X Corps rapidly defeated the KPA defenders around Seoul, thus threatening to trap the main KPA force in Southern Korea. On 18 September, Stalin dispatched General H. M. Zakharov to North Korea to advise Kim Il-sung to halt his offensive around the Pusan perimeter and to redeploy his forces to defend Seoul. Chinese commanders were not briefed on North Korean troop numbers or operational plans. As the overall commander of Chinese forces, Zhou Enlai suggested that the North Koreans should attempt to eliminate the UN forces at Incheon only if they had reserves of at least 100,000 men; otherwise, he advised the North Koreans to withdraw their forces north.

On 25 September, Seoul was recaptured by UN forces. U.S. air raids caused heavy damage to the KPA, destroying most of its tanks and much of its artillery. KPA troops in the south, instead of effectively withdrawing north, rapidly disintegrated, leaving Pyongyang vulnerable. During the general retreat, only 25,000 to 30,000 KPA soldiers managed to reach the KPA lines. On 27 September, Stalin convened an emergency session of the Politburo, in which he condemned the incompetence of the KPA command and held Soviet military advisers responsible for the defeat.

UN forces invade North Korea (September–October 1950)

On 27 September, MacArthur received the top secret National Security Council Memorandum 81/1 from Truman reminding him that operations north of the 38th Parallel were authorized only if "at the time of such operation there was no entry into North Korea by major Soviet or Chinese Communist forces, no announcements of intended entry, nor a threat to counter our operations militarily". On 29 September, MacArthur restored the government of the Republic of Korea under Syngman Rhee. On 30 September, U.S. Defense Secretary George Marshall sent an eyes-only message to MacArthur: "We want you to feel unhampered tactically and strategically to proceed north of the 38th parallel." During October, the South Korean police executed people who were suspected to be sympathetic to North Korea, and similar massacres were carried out until early 1951. The Joint Chiefs of Staff on 27 September sent to General MacArthur a comprehensive directive to govern his future actions: the directive stated that the primary goal was the destruction of the KPA, with unification of the Korean Peninsula under Rhee as a secondary objective "if possible"; the Joint Chiefs added that this objective was dependent on whether or not the Chinese and Soviets would intervene, and was subject to changing conditions.

On 30 September, Zhou Enlai warned the U.S. that China was prepared to intervene in Korea if the U.S. crossed the 38th Parallel. Zhou attempted to advise KPA commanders on how to conduct a general withdrawal by using the same tactics that allowed Chinese communist forces to successfully escape Chiang Kai-shek's encirclement campaigns in the 1930s, but by some accounts, KPA commanders did not use these tactics effectively. Historian Bruce Cumings argues, however, that the KPA's rapid withdrawal was strategic, with troops melting into the mountains from where they could launch guerrilla raids on the UN forces spread out on the coasts.

By 1 October 1950, the UN Command repelled the KPA northwards past the 38th Parallel; the ROK advanced after them, into North Korea. MacArthur made a statement demanding the KPA's unconditional surrender. Six days later, on 7 October, with UN authorization, the UN Command forces followed the ROK forces northwards. The X Corps landed at Wonsan (in southeastern North Korea) and Riwon (in northeastern North Korea) on 26 October, but these cities had already been captured by ROK forces. The Eighth U.S. Army drove up western Korea and captured Pyongyang on 19 October 1950. The 187th Airborne Regimental Combat Team made their first of two combat jumps during the Korean War on 20 October 1950 at Sunchon and Sukchon. The mission was to cut the road north going to China, preventing North Korean leaders from escaping from Pyongyang; and to rescue U.S. prisoners of war. At month's end, UN forces held 135,000 KPA prisoners of war. In addition to the 135,000 captured, the KPA had also suffered some 200,000 soldiers killed or wounded for a total of 335,000 casualties since the end of June 1950, and had lost 313 tanks (mostly T-34/85 models). A mere 25,000 KPA regulars retreated across the 38th Parallel, as their military had entirely collapsed. The UN forces on the peninsula numbered 229,722 combat troops (including 125,126 Americans and 82,786 South Koreans), 119,559 rear area troops, and 36,667 U.S. Air Force personnel.

Taking advantage of the UN Command's strategic momentum against the communists, MacArthur believed it necessary to extend the Korean War into China to destroy depots supplying the North Korean war effort. Truman disagreed, and ordered caution at the Sino-Korean border.

China intervenes (October–December 1950)

On 30 June 1950, five days after the outbreak of the war, Zhou Enlai, premier of the PRC and vice-chairman of the Central Military Committee of the CCP (CMCC), decided to send a group of Chinese military intelligence personnel to North Korea to establish better communications with Kim II-Sung as well as to collect firsthand materials on the fighting. One week later, on 7 July, Zhou and Mao chaired a conference discussing military preparations for the Korean Conflict. Another conference took place on 10 July. Here, it was decided that the Thirteenth Army Corps under the Fourth Field Army of the People's Liberation Army (PLA), one of the best-trained and -equipped units in China, would be immediately transformed into the Northeastern Border Defense Army (NEBDA) to prepare for "an intervention in the Korean War if necessary". On 13 July, the CMCC formally issued the order to establish the NEBDA, appointing Deng Hua, the commander of the Fifteenth Army Corps and one of the most talented commanders of the Chinese Civil War, to coordinate all preparation efforts.

On 20 August 1950, Premier Zhou Enlai informed the UN that "Korea is China's neighbor... The Chinese people cannot but be concerned about a solution of the Korean question". Thus, through neutral-country diplomats, China warned that in safeguarding Chinese national security, they would intervene against the UN Command in Korea. President Truman interpreted the communication as "a bald attempt to blackmail the UN", and dismissed it. Mao ordered that his troops should be ready for action by the end of August. Stalin, by contrast, was reluctant to escalate the war with a Chinese intervention.

On 1 October 1950, the day that UN troops crossed the 38th Parallel, the Soviet ambassador forwarded a telegram from Stalin to Mao and Zhou requesting that China send five to six divisions into Korea, and Kim Il-sung sent frantic appeals to Mao for Chinese military intervention. At the same time, Stalin made it clear that Soviet forces themselves would not directly intervene.

In a series of emergency meetings that lasted from 2 to 5 October, Chinese leaders debated whether to send Chinese troops into Korea. There was considerable resistance among many leaders, including senior military leaders, to confronting the U.S. in Korea. Mao strongly supported intervention, and Zhou was one of the few Chinese leaders who firmly supported him. After Lin Biao politely refused Mao's offer to command Chinese forces in Korea (citing his upcoming medical treatment), Mao decided that Peng Dehuai would be the commander of the Chinese forces in Korea after Peng agreed to support Mao's position. Mao then asked Peng to speak in favor of intervention to the rest of the Chinese leaders. After Peng made the case that if U.S. troops conquered Korea and reached the Yalu, they might cross it and invade China, the Politburo agreed to intervene in Korea. On 4 August 1950, with a planned invasion of Taiwan aborted due to the heavy U.S. naval presence, Mao reported to the Politburo that he would intervene in Korea when the PLA's Taiwan invasion force was reorganized into the PLA North East Frontier Force. On 8 October 1950, Mao redesignated the PLA North East Frontier Force as the People's Volunteer Army (PVA).

To enlist Stalin's support, Zhou and a Chinese delegation arrived in Moscow on 10 October, at which point they flew to Stalin's home on the Black Sea. There, they conferred with the top Soviet leadership, which included Joseph Stalin as well as Vyacheslav Molotov, Lavrentiy Beria and Georgy Malenkov. Stalin initially agreed to send military equipment and ammunition but warned Zhou that the Soviet Air Force would need two or three months to prepare any operations. In a subsequent meeting, Stalin told Zhou that he would only provide China with equipment on a credit basis and that the Soviet Air Force would only operate over Chinese airspace, and only after an undisclosed period of time. Stalin did not agree to send either military equipment or air support until March 1951. Mao did not find Soviet air support especially useful, as the fighting was going to take place on the south side of the Yalu. Soviet shipments of matériel, when they did arrive, were limited to small quantities of trucks, grenades, machine guns, and the like.

In a meeting on 13 October, the Politburo of the Chinese Communist Party decided that China would intervene even in the absence of Soviet air support, basing its decision on a belief that superior morale could defeat an enemy that had superior equipment. Immediately on his return to Beijing on 18 October 1950, Zhou met with Mao Zedong, Peng Dehuai and Gao Gang, and the group ordered two hundred thousand PVA troops to enter North Korea, which they did on 19 October. UN aerial reconnaissance had difficulty sighting PVA units in daytime, because their march and bivouac discipline minimized aerial detection. The PVA marched "dark-to-dark" (19:00–03:00), and aerial camouflage (concealing soldiers, pack animals, and equipment) was deployed by 05:30. Meanwhile, daylight advance parties scouted for the next bivouac site. During daylight activity or marching, soldiers were to remain motionless if an aircraft appeared, until it flew away; PVA officers were under order to shoot security violators. Another division night-marched a circuitous mountain route, averaging  daily for 18 days.

Meanwhile, on 15 October 1950, President Truman and General MacArthur met at Wake Island. This meeting was much publicized because of the General's discourteous refusal to meet the President on the continental United States. To President Truman, MacArthur speculated there was little risk of Chinese intervention in Korea, and that the PRC's opportunity for aiding the KPA had lapsed. He believed the PRC had some 300,000 soldiers in Manchuria and some 100,000–125,000 soldiers at the Yalu River. He further concluded that, although half of those forces might cross south, "if the Chinese tried to get down to Pyongyang, there would be the greatest slaughter" without air force protection.

After secretly crossing the Yalu River on 19 October, the PVA 13th Army Group launched the First Phase Offensive on 25 October, attacking the advancing UN forces near the Sino-Korean border. This military decision made solely by China changed the attitude of the Soviet Union. Twelve days after PVA troops entered the war, Stalin allowed the Soviet Air Force to provide air cover and supported more aid to China. After inflicting heavy losses on the ROK II Corps at the Battle of Onjong, the first confrontation between Chinese and U.S. military occurred on 1 November 1950. Deep in North Korea, thousands of soldiers from the PVA 39th Army encircled and attacked the U.S. 8th Cavalry Regiment with three-prong assaults—from the north, northwest, and west—and overran the defensive position flanks in the Battle of Unsan. The surprise assault resulted in the UN forces retreating back to the Ch'ongch'on River, while the PVA unexpectedly disappeared into mountain hideouts following victory. It is unclear why the Chinese did not press the attack and follow up their victory.

The UN Command, however, were unconvinced that the Chinese had openly intervened because of the sudden PVA withdrawal. On 24 November, the Home-by-Christmas Offensive was launched with the U.S. Eighth Army advancing in northwest Korea, while U.S. X Corps attacked along the Korean east coast. But the PVA were waiting in ambush with their Second Phase Offensive, which they executed at two sectors: in the East at the Chosin Reservoir and in the Western sector at Ch'ongch'on River.

On 13 November, Mao appointed Zhou Enlai the overall commander and coordinator of the war effort, with Peng as field commander. On 25 November, on the Korean western front, the PVA 13th Army Group attacked and overran the ROK II Corps at the Battle of the Ch'ongch'on River, and then inflicted heavy losses on the U.S. 2nd Infantry Division on the UN forces' right flank. Believing that they could not hold against the PVA, the Eighth Army began to retreat from North Korea crossing the 38th Parallel in mid-December. UN morale hit rock bottom when Lieutenant General Walton Walker, commander of the U.S. Eighth Army, was killed on 23 December 1950 in an automobile accident.

In the east, on 27 November, the PVA 9th Army Group initiated the Battle of Chosin Reservoir. Here, the UN forces fared comparatively better: like the Eighth Army, the surprise attack also forced X Corps to retreat from northeast Korea, but they were, in the process, able to break out from the attempted encirclement by the PVA and execute a successful tactical withdrawal. X Corps managed to establish a defensive perimeter at the port city of Hungnam on 11 December and were able to evacuate by 24 December to reinforce the badly depleted U.S. Eighth Army to the south. During the evacuation, about 193 shiploads of UN forces and matériel (approximately 105,000 soldiers, 98,000 civilians, 17,500 vehicles, and 350,000 tons of supplies) were evacuated to Pusan. The SS Meredith Victory was noted for evacuating 14,000 refugees, the largest rescue operation by a single ship, even though it was designed to hold 12 passengers. Before escaping, the UN forces razed most of Hungnam city, with particular attention to the port facilities. The UN retreat from North Korea also saw the massive evacuation from the capital city of Pyongyang. In early December, UN forces, including the British Army's 29th Infantry Brigade, evacuated Pyongyang, along with large numbers of refugees. Around 4.5 million North Koreans are estimated to have fled from North Korea to either the South or elsewhere abroad. On 16 December 1950, President Truman declared a national state of emergency with Presidential Proclamation No. 2914, 3 C.F.R. 99 (1953), which remained in force until 14 September 1978. The next day, 17 December 1950, Kim Il-sung was deprived of the right of command of KPA by China.

China justified its entry into the war as a response to what it described as "American aggression in the guise of the UN". Chinese decision-makers feared that the American-led invasion of North Korea was part of a U.S. strategy to invade China ultimately. They were also worried about rising counterrevolutionary activity at home. MacArthur's public statements that he wanted to extend the Korean War into China, and return the Kuomintang to power reinforced this fear. Later, the Chinese claimed that U.S. bombers had violated PRC national airspace on three separate occasions and attacked Chinese targets before China intervened.

Fighting around the 38th Parallel (January–June 1951)
A ceasefire presented by the UN to the PRC shortly after the Battle of the Ch'ongch'on River on 11 December 1950, was rejected by the Chinese government, which was convinced of the PVA's invincibility after its victory in that battle and the wider Second Phase Offensive, and also wanted to demonstrate China's desire for a total victory through the expulsion of the UN forces from Korea. With Lieutenant General Matthew Ridgway assuming the command of the U.S. Eighth Army on 26 December, the PVA and the KPA launched their Third Phase Offensive (also known as the "Chinese New Year's Offensive") on New Year's Eve of 1950/51. Utilizing night attacks in which UN fighting positions were encircled and then assaulted by numerically superior troops who had the element of surprise, the attacks were accompanied by loud trumpets and gongs, which fulfilled the double purpose of facilitating tactical communication and mentally disorienting the enemy. UN forces initially had no familiarity with this tactic, and as a result, some soldiers panicked, abandoning their weapons and retreating to the south. The offensive overwhelmed UN forces, allowing the PVA and KPA to capture Seoul for the second time on 4 January 1951. Following this, the CPV party committee issued orders regarding tasks during rest and reorganization on 8 January 1951, outlining Chinese war goals. The orders read: "the central issue is for the whole party and army to overcome difficulties ... to improve tactics and skills. When the next campaign starts ... we will annihilate all enemies and liberate all Korea." In his telegram to Peng on 14 January, Mao stressed the importance of preparing for "the last battle" in the spring in order to "fundamentally resolve the [Korean] issue".

These setbacks prompted General MacArthur to consider using nuclear weapons against the Chinese or North Korean interiors, intending radioactive fallout zones to interrupt the Chinese supply chains. However, upon the arrival of the charismatic General Ridgway, the esprit de corps of the bloodied Eighth Army immediately began to revive.

UN forces retreated to Suwon in the west, Wonju in the center, and the territory north of Samcheok in the east, where the battlefront stabilized and held. The PVA had outrun its logistics capability and thus were unable to press on beyond Seoul as food, ammunition, and matériel were carried nightly, on foot and bicycle, from the border at the Yalu River to the three battle lines. In late January, upon finding that the PVA had abandoned their battle lines, General Ridgway ordered a reconnaissance-in-force, which became Operation Thunderbolt (25 January 1951). A full-scale advance followed, which fully exploited the UN's air superiority, concluding with the UN forces reaching the Han River and recapturing Wonju.

Following the failure of ceasefire negotiations in January, the United Nations General Assembly passed Resolution 498 on 1 February, condemning the PRC as an aggressor, and called upon its forces to withdraw from Korea.

In early February, the ROK 11th Division ran an operation to destroy guerrillas and pro-DPRK sympathizers in Southern Korea. During the operation, the division and police conducted the Geochang massacre and Sancheong–Hamyang massacre. In mid-February, the PVA counterattacked with the Fourth Phase Offensive and achieved initial victory at Hoengseong. However, the offensive was soon blunted by U.S. IX Corps at Chipyong-ni in the center. The U.S. 23rd Regimental Combat Team and the French Battalion fought a short but desperate battle that broke the attack's momentum. The battle is sometimes known as the "Gettysburg of the Korean War": 5,600 South Korean, U.S., and French troops were surrounded on all sides by 25,000 PVA. UN forces had previously retreated in the face of large PVA/KPA forces instead of getting cut off, but this time, they stood and fought, and won.

In the last two weeks of February 1951, Operation Thunderbolt was followed by Operation Killer, carried out by the revitalized Eighth Army. It was a full-scale, battlefront-length attack staged for maximum exploitation of firepower to kill as many KPA and PVA troops as possible. Operation Killer concluded with U.S. I Corps re-occupying the territory south of the Han River, and IX Corps capturing Hoengseong. On 7 March 1951, the Eighth Army attacked with Operation Ripper, expelling the PVA and the KPA from Seoul on 14 March 1951. This was the fourth and final conquest of the city in a year's time, leaving it a ruin; the 1.5 million pre-war population was down to 200,000, and people were suffering from severe food shortages.

On 1 March 1951, Mao sent a cable to Stalin emphasizing the difficulties faced by Chinese forces and the need for air cover, especially over supply lines. Apparently impressed by the Chinese war effort, Stalin agreed to supply two air force divisions, three anti-aircraft divisions, and six thousand trucks. PVA troops in Korea continued to suffer severe logistical problems throughout the war. In late April, Peng Dehuai sent his deputy, Hong Xuezhi, to brief Zhou Enlai in Beijing. What Chinese soldiers feared, Hong said, was not the enemy, but having no food, bullets, or trucks to transport them to the rear when they were wounded. Zhou attempted to respond to the PVA's logistical concerns by increasing Chinese production and improving supply methods, but these efforts were never sufficient. At the same time, large-scale air defense training programs were carried out, and the People's Liberation Army Air Force (PLAAF) began participating in the war from September 1951 onward. The Fourth Phase Offensive had catastrophically failed, in contrast to the success of the Second Phase Offensive and limited gains of the Third Phase Offensive. The UN forces, after earlier defeats and subsequent retraining, proved much harder to infiltrate by Chinese light infantry than they had been in previous months. From 31 January to 21 April, the Chinese had suffered 53,000 casualties.

On 11 April 1951, President Truman relieved General MacArthur as Supreme Commander in Korea. There were several reasons for the dismissal. MacArthur had crossed the 38th Parallel in the mistaken belief that the Chinese would not enter the war, leading to major allied losses. He believed that the use of nuclear weapons should be his decision, not the President's. MacArthur threatened to destroy China unless it surrendered. While MacArthur felt total victory was the only honorable outcome, Truman was more pessimistic about his chances once involved in a larger war, feeling that a truce and orderly withdrawal from Korea could be a valid solution. MacArthur was the subject of congressional hearings in May and June 1951, which determined that he had defied the orders of the President and thus had violated the U.S. Constitution. A popular criticism of MacArthur was that he never spent a night in Korea, and directed the war from the safety of Tokyo.

MacArthur was relieved primarily due to his determination to expand the war into China, which other officials believed would needlessly escalate a limited war and consume too many already overstretched resources. Despite MacArthur's claims that he was restricted to fighting a limited war when China was fighting all-out, congressional testimony revealed China was using restraint as much as the U.S. was, as they were not using air power against front-line troops, communication lines, ports, naval air forces, or staging bases in Japan, which had been crucial to the survival of UN forces in Korea. Simply fighting on the peninsula had already tied down significant portions of U.S. airpower; as Air Force chief of staff Hoyt Vandenberg said, 80–85% of the tactical capacity, one-fourth of the strategic portion, and 20% of air defense forces of the USAF were engaged in a single country. There was also fear that crossing into China would provoke the Soviet Union into entering the war. General Omar Bradley testified that there were 35 Russian divisions totaling some 500,000 troops in the Far East, and if sent into action with the approximately 85 Russian submarines in the vicinity of Korea, they could overwhelm U.S. forces and cut supply lines, as well as potentially assist China in taking over territory in Southeast Asia.

General Ridgway was appointed Supreme Commander in Korea, and he regrouped the UN forces for successful counterattacks, while General James Van Fleet assumed command of the U.S. Eighth Army. Further attacks slowly depleted the PVA and KPA forces; Operations Courageous (23–28 March 1951) and Tomahawk (23 March 1951) (a combat jump by the 187th Airborne Regimental Combat Team) were a joint ground and airborne infiltration meant to trap PVA forces between Kaesong and Seoul. UN forces advanced to the Kansas Line, north of the 38th Parallel.

The PVA counterattacked in April 1951, with the Fifth Phase Offensive, with three field armies (approximately 700,000 men). The first thrust of the offensive fell upon I Corps, which fiercely resisted in the Battle of the Imjin River (22–25 April 1951) and the Battle of Kapyong (22–25 April 1951), blunting the impetus of the offensive, which was halted at the No-name Line north of Seoul. Casualty ratios were grievously disproportionate; Peng had expected a 1–1 or 2-1 ratio, but instead, Chinese combat casualties from 22 to 29 April totaled between 40,000 and 60,000 compared to only 4,000 for the UN —a casualty ratio between 10–1 and 15–1. By the time Peng had called off the attack in the western sector on 29 April, the three participating armies had lost a third of their front-line combat strength within a week. Additional casualties were incurred on 30 April. On 15 May 1951, the PVA commenced the second impulse of the Spring Offensive and attacked the ROK and U.S. X Corps in the east at the Soyang River. Approximately 370,000 PVA and 114,000 KPA troops had been mobilized for the second step of the Fifth Phase Offensive, with the bulk attacking in the eastern sector with about a quarter attempting to pin the U.S. I Corps and IX Corps in the western sector. After initial success, they were halted by 20 May and repulsed over the following days, with Western histories generally designating 22 May as the end of the offensive. At month's end, the Chinese planned the third step of the Fifth Phase Offensive (withdrawal), which they estimated would take 10 to 15 days to complete for their 340,000 remaining men, and set the retreat date for the night of 23 May. They were caught off guard when the U.S. Eighth Army counterattacked and regained the Kansas Line on the morning of 12 May, 23 hours before the expected withdrawal. The surprise attack turned the retreat into "the most severe loss since our forces had entered Korea"; from 16 May to 23 May, the PVA had suffered another 45,000 to 60,000 casualties before their remaining soldiers managed to evacuate back north. Per official Chinese statistics, the Fifth Phase Offensive as a whole had cost the PVA 102,000 soldiers (85,000 killed/wounded, 17,000 captured), with unknown but significant losses for the KPA.

The end of the Fifth Phase Offensive preceded the start of the UN May–June 1951 counteroffensive. PVA and KPA forces suffered greatly during this offensive, especially in the Chuncheon sector and at Chiam-ni and Hwacheon; in the latter sector alone the PVA/KPA suffered over 73,207 casualties, including 8,749 captured, compared to 2,647 total casualties of the U.S. IX Corps which engaged them. The UN's Kansas Line halt and subsequent offensive action stand-down began the stalemate that lasted until the armistice of 1953. The disastrous failure of the Fifth Phase Offensive (which Peng later recalled as one of only four mistakes he made in his military career) "led Chinese leaders to change their goal from driving the UNF out of Korea to merely defending China's security and ending the war through negotiations".

Stalemate (July 1951 – July 1953)
For the remainder of the war, the UN and the PVA/KPA fought but exchanged little territory, as the stalemate held. Large-scale bombing of North Korea continued, and protracted armistice negotiations began on 10 July 1951 at Kaesong, an ancient capital of Korea located in PVA/KPA held territory. On the Chinese side, Zhou Enlai directed peace talks, and Li Kenong and Qiao Guanghua headed the negotiation team. Combat continued while the belligerents negotiated; the goal of the UN forces was to recapture all of South Korea and to avoid losing territory. The PVA and the KPA attempted similar operations and later effected military and psychological operations to test the UN Command's resolve to continue the war. The two sides constantly traded artillery fire along the front, with American-led forces possessing a large firepower advantage over the Chinese-led forces. For example, in the last three months of 1952 the UN fired 3,553,518 field gun shells and 2,569,941 mortar shells, while the Communists fired 377,782 field gun shells and 672,194 mortar shells: an overall 5.83:1 ratio in the UN's favor. The Communist insurgency, reinvigorated by North Korean support and scattered bands of KPA stragglers, also resurged in the south. In the autumn of 1951, Van Fleet ordered Major General Paik Sun-yup to break the back of guerrilla activity. From December 1951 to March 1952, ROK security forces claimed to have killed 11,090 partisans and sympathizers and captured 9,916 more.

The principal battles of the stalemate include the Battle of Bloody Ridge (18 August–15 September 1951), the Battle of the Punchbowl (31 August-21 September 1951), the Battle of Heartbreak Ridge (13 September–15 October 1951), the Battle of Old Baldy (26 June–4 August 1952), the Battle of White Horse (6–15 October 1952), the Battle of Triangle Hill (14 October–25 November 1952), the Battle of Hill Eerie (21 March–21 June 1952), the sieges of Outpost Harry (10–18 June 1953), the Battle of the Hook (28–29 May 1953), the Battle of Pork Chop Hill (23 March–16 July 1953), and the Battle of Kumsong (13–27 July 1953).

PVA troops suffered from deficient military equipment, serious logistical problems, overextended communication and supply lines, and the constant threat of UN bombers. All of these factors generally led to a rate of Chinese casualties that was far greater than the casualties suffered by UN troops. The situation became so serious that, in November 1951, Zhou Enlai called a conference in Shenyang to discuss the PVA's logistical problems. At the meeting, it was decided to accelerate the construction of railways and airfields in the area to increase the number of trucks available to the army, and to improve air defense by any means possible. These commitments did little to address the problems directly that confronted PVA troops.

In the months after the Shenyang conference, Peng Dehuai went to Beijing several times to brief Mao and Zhou about the heavy casualties suffered by Chinese troops and the increasing difficulty of keeping the front lines supplied with basic necessities. Peng was convinced that the war would be protracted and that neither side would be able to achieve victory in the near future. On 24 February 1952, the Military Commission, presided over by Zhou, discussed the PVA's logistical problems with members of various government agencies involved in the war effort. After the government representatives emphasized their inability to meet the demands of the war, Peng, in an angry outburst, shouted: "You have this and that problem... You should go to the front and see with your own eyes what food and clothing the soldiers have! Not to speak of the casualties! For what are they giving their lives? We have no aircraft. We have only a few guns. Transports are not protected. More and more soldiers are dying of starvation. Can't you overcome some of your difficulties?" The atmosphere became so tense that Zhou was forced to adjourn the conference. Zhou subsequently called a series of meetings, where it was agreed that the PVA would be divided into three groups, to be dispatched to Korea in shifts; to accelerate the training of Chinese pilots; to provide more anti-aircraft guns to the front lines; to purchase more military equipment and ammunition from the Soviet Union; to provide the army with more food and clothing; and to transfer the responsibility of logistics to the central government.

With peace negotiations ongoing, the Chinese attempted one final offensive in the final weeks of the war to capture territory: on 10 June, 30,000 Chinese troops struck two South Korean and one U.S. divisions on a  front, and on 13 July, 80,000 Chinese soldiers struck the east-central Kumsong sector, with the brunt of their attack falling on four South Korean divisions. In both cases, the Chinese had some success in penetrating South Korean lines, but failed to capitalize, particularly when the U.S. forces present responded with overwhelming firepower. Chinese casualties in their final major offensive of the war (above normal wastage for the front) were about 72,000, including 25,000 killed in action compared to 14,000 for the UN (the vast majority of these deaths were South Koreans, though 1,611 were Americans). The Communists fired 704,695 field gun shells in June–July compared to 4,711,230 fired by the UN, a ratio of 1:6.69. June 1953 saw the highest monthly artillery expenditure of the war by both sides.

Armistice (July 1953 – November 1954)

The on-again, off-again armistice negotiations continued for two years, first at Kaesong, on the border between North and South Korea, and then at the neighboring village of Panmunjom. A major, problematic negotiation point was prisoner of war (POW) repatriation. The PVA, KPA and UN Command could not agree on a system of repatriation because many PVA and KPA soldiers refused to be repatriated back to the north, which was unacceptable to the Chinese and North Koreans. A Neutral Nations Repatriation Commission, under the chairman Indian General K. S. Thimayya, was subsequently set up to handle the matter.

In 1952, the U.S. elected a new president, and on 29 November 1952, the president-elect, Dwight D. Eisenhower, went to Korea to learn what might end the Korean War. Eisenhower took office on 20 January 1953. Joseph Stalin died a few weeks later on 5 March. The new Soviet leaders, engaged in their internal power struggle, had no desire to continue supporting China's efforts in Korea, and issued a statement calling for an end to the hostilities. China could not continue the war without Soviet aid and North Korea was no longer a major player. Armistice talks entered a new phase. With the United Nations' acceptance of India's proposed Korean War armistice, the KPA, the PVA and the UN Command signed the Korean Armistice Agreement on 27 July 1953. South Korean president Syngman Rhee refused to sign the agreement. The war is considered to have ended at this point, even though there was no peace treaty. North Korea nevertheless claims that it won the Korean War.

Under the Armistice Agreement, the belligerents established the Korean Demilitarized Zone (DMZ), along the front line, which vaguely follows the 38th Parallel. In the eastern part, the DMZ runs north of the 38th Parallel; to the west, it travels south of it. Kaesong, site of the initial armistice negotiations, was originally in pre-war South Korea but now is part of North Korea. The DMZ has since been patrolled by the KPA and the ROK and the U.S. still operating as the UN Command.

The Armistice also called upon the governments of South Korea, North Korea, China and the United States to participate in continued peace talks.

After the war, Operation Glory was conducted from July to November 1954, to allow combatant countries to exchange their dead. The remains of 4,167 U.S. Army and U.S. Marine Corps dead were exchanged for 13,528 KPA and PVA dead, and 546 civilians dead in UN prisoner-of-war camps were delivered to the South Korean government. After Operation Glory, 416 Korean War unknown soldiers were buried in the National Memorial Cemetery of the Pacific (The Punchbowl), on the island of Oahu, Hawaii. Defense Prisoner of War/Missing Personnel Office (DPMO) records indicate that the PRC and North Korea transmitted 1,394 names, of which 858 were correct. From 4,167 containers of returned remains, forensic examination identified 4,219 individuals. Of these, 2,944 were identified as from the U.S., and all but 416 were identified by name. From 1996 to 2006, North Korea recovered 220 remains near the Sino-Korean border.

Division of Korea (1954–present)

The Korean Armistice Agreement provided for monitoring by an international commission. Since 1953, the Neutral Nations Supervisory Commission (NNSC), composed of members from the Swiss and Swedish Armed Forces, has been stationed near the DMZ.

In April 1975, South Vietnam's capital was captured by the People's Army of Vietnam. Encouraged by the success of the Communist revolution in Indochina, Kim Il-sung saw it as an opportunity to invade the South. Kim visited China in April of that year and met with Mao Zedong and Zhou Enlai to ask for military aid. Despite Pyongyang's expectations, however, Beijing refused to help North Korea for another war in Korea.

Since the armistice, there have been numerous incursions and acts of aggression by North Korea. From 1966 to 1969, a large number of cross-border incursions took place in what has been referred to as the Korean DMZ Conflict or the Second Korean War. In 1968, a North Korean commando team unsuccessfully attempted to assassinate South Korean president Park Chung-hee in the Blue House Raid. In 1976, the axe murder incident was widely publicized. Since 1974, four incursion tunnels leading to Seoul have been uncovered. In 2010, a North Korean submarine torpedoed and sank the South Korean corvette , resulting in the deaths of 46 sailors. Again in 2010, North Korea fired artillery shells on Yeonpyeong island, killing two military personnel and two civilians.

After a new wave of UN sanctions, on 11 March 2013, North Korea claimed that the armistice had become invalid. On 13 March 2013, North Korea confirmed it ended the 1953 Armistice and declared North Korea "is not restrained by the North-South declaration on non-aggression". On 30 March 2013, North Korea stated that it entered a "state of war" with South Korea and declared that "The long-standing situation of the Korean peninsula being neither at peace nor at war is finally over". Speaking on 4 April 2013, the U.S. Secretary of Defense, Chuck Hagel, informed the press that Pyongyang "formally informed" the Pentagon that it "ratified" the potential use of a nuclear weapon against South Korea, Japan and the United States of America, including Guam and Hawaii. Hagel also stated the U.S. would deploy the Terminal High Altitude Area Defense anti-ballistic missile system to Guam, because of a credible and realistic nuclear threat from North Korea.

In 2016, it was revealed that North Korea approached the United States about conducting formal peace talks to end the war officially. While the White House agreed to secret peace talks, the plan was rejected due to North Korea's refusal to discuss nuclear disarmament as part of the terms of the treaty.

On 27 April 2018, it was announced that North Korea and South Korea agreed to talks to end the ongoing 65-year conflict. They committed themselves to the complete denuclearization of the Korean Peninsula.

On 22 September 2021, South Korean President Moon Jae-In reiterated his call to end the Korean War formally, in his speech at the United Nations General Assembly.

Characteristics

Casualties
Approximately 3 million people died in the Korean War, the majority of whom were civilians, making it perhaps the deadliest conflict of the Cold War era. Samuel S. Kim lists the Korean War as the deadliest conflict in East Asia—itself the region most affected by armed conflict related to the Cold War—from 1945 to 1994, with 3 million dead, more than the Vietnam War and Chinese Civil War during the same period. Although only rough estimates of civilian fatalities are available, scholars from Guenter Lewy to Bruce Cumings have noted that the percentage of civilian casualties in Korea was higher than in World War II or the Vietnam War, with Cumings putting civilian casualties at 2 million and Lewy estimating civilian deaths in the range of 2 million to 3 million. Cumings states that civilians represent "at least" half of the war's casualties, while Lewy suggests that the civilian portion of the death toll "may have gone as high as 70 percent", compared to Lewy's estimates of 42% in World War II and 30%–46% in the Vietnam War. Data compiled by the Peace Research Institute Oslo (PRIO) lists just under 1 million "battle deaths" over the course of the Korean War (with a range of 644,696 to 1.5 million) and a mid-value estimate of 3 million total deaths (with a range of 1.5 million to 4.5 million), attributing the difference to excess mortality among civilians from one-sided massacres, starvation, and disease. Compounding this devastation for Korean civilians, virtually all of the major cities on the entire Korean Peninsula were destroyed as a result of the war. In both per capita and absolute terms, North Korea was the country most devastated by the war. According to Charles K. Armstrong, the war resulted in the death of an estimated 12%–15% of the North Korean population ( 10 million), "a figure close to or surpassing the proportion of Soviet citizens killed in World War II".

Military

According to the data from the U.S. Department of Defense, the U.S. suffered 33,686 battle deaths, along with 2,830 non-battle deaths during the Korean War. There were 17,730 other non-battle U.S. military deaths that occurred outside Korea during the same period that were erroneously included as Korean War deaths until 2000. American combat casualties were over 90 percent of non-Korean UN losses. U.S. battle deaths were 8,516 up to their first engagement with the Chinese on 1 November 1950. The first four months of the Korean War, that is, the war prior to the Chinese intervention (which started near the end of October), were by far the bloodiest per day for the U.S. forces as they engaged and destroyed the comparatively well-equipped KPA in intense fighting. American medical records show that from July to October 1950, the U.S. Army sustained 31 percent of the combat deaths it ultimately incurred in the entire 37-month war. The U.S. spent U.S.$30 billion in total on the war. Some 1,789,000 American soldiers served in the Korean War, accounting for 31 percent of the 5,720,000 Americans who served on active-duty worldwide from June 1950 to July 1953.

South Korea reported some 137,899 military deaths and 24,495 missing. Deaths from the other non-American UN militaries totaled 3,730, with another 379 missing.

Data from official Chinese sources reported that the PVA had suffered 114,000 battle deaths, 21,000 deaths from wounds, 13,000 deaths from illness, 340,000 wounded, and 7,600 missing during the war. 7,110 Chinese POWs were repatriated to China. In 2010, the Chinese government revised their official tally of war losses to 183,108 dead (114,084 in combat, 70,000 deaths from wounds, illness and other causes) and 25,621 missing. Overall, 73 percent of Chinese infantry troops served in Korea (25 of 34 armies, or 79 of 109 infantry divisions, were rotated in). More than 52 percent of the Chinese air force, 55 percent of the tank units, 67 percent of the artillery divisions, and 100 percent of the railroad engineering divisions were sent to Korea as well. Chinese soldiers who served in Korea faced a greater chance of being killed than those who served in World War II or the Chinese Civil War. In terms of financial cost, China spent over 10 billion yuan on the war (roughly U.S.$3.3 billion), not counting USSR aid that had been donated or forgiven. This included $1.3 billion in money owed to the Soviet Union by the end of it. This was a relatively large cost, as China had only 1/25 the national income of the United States. Spending on the Korean War constituted 34–43 percent of China's annual government budget from 1950 to 1953, depending on the year. Despite its underdeveloped economy, Chinese military spending was the world's fourth largest globally for most of the war after that of the United States, the Soviet Union, and the United Kingdom; however, by 1953, with the winding down of the Korean War (which ended halfway through the year) and the escalation of the First Indochina War (which reached its peak in 1953–1954), French spending also surpassed Chinese spending by about a third.

According to the South Korean Ministry of National Defense, North Korean military losses totaled 294,151 dead, 91,206 missing, and 229,849 wounded, giving North Korea the highest military deaths of any belligerent in both absolute and relative terms. The PRIO Battle Deaths Dataset gave a similar figure for North Korean military deaths of 316,579. Chinese sources reported similar figures for the North Korean military of 290,000 "casualties" and 90,000 captured. The exact financial cost of the war for North Korea is unknown but was known to be massive in terms of both direct losses and lost economic activity; the country was devastated both by the cost of the war itself and the American strategic bombing campaign, which, among other things, destroyed 85 percent of North Korea's buildings and 95 percent of its power generation capacity.

The Chinese and North Koreans estimated that about 390,000 soldiers from the United States, 660,000 soldiers from South Korea and 29,000 other UN soldiers were "eliminated" from the battlefield. Western sources estimate the PVA suffered about 400,000 killed and 486,000 wounded, while the KPA suffered 215,000 killed, 303,000 wounded, and over 101,000 captured or missing. Cumings cites a much higher figure of 900,000 fatalities among Chinese soldiers.

Civilian
According to the South Korean Ministry of National Defense, there were over three-quarters of a million confirmed violent civilians deaths during the war, another million civilians were pronounced missing, and millions more ended up as refugees. In South Korea, some 373,500 civilians were killed, more than 225,600 wounded, and over 387,740 were listed as missing. During the first communist occupation of Seoul alone, the KPA massacred 128,936 civilians and deported another 84,523 to North Korea. On the other side of the border, some 1,594,000 North Koreans were reported as casualties including 406,000 civilians reported as killed, and 680,000 missing. Over 1.5 million North Koreans fled to the South during the war.

U.S. unpreparedness for war
In a postwar analysis of the unpreparedness of U.S. Army forces deployed to Korea during the summer and fall of 1950, Army Major General Floyd L. Parks stated that "Many who never lived to tell the tale had to fight the full range of ground warfare from offensive to delaying action, unit by unit, man by man ... [T]hat we were able to snatch victory from the jaws of defeat ... does not relieve us from the blame of having placed our own flesh and blood in such a predicament."

By 1950, U.S. Secretary of Defense Louis A. Johnson had established a policy of faithfully following President Truman's defense economization plans and had aggressively attempted to implement it even in the face of steadily increasing external threats. He consequently received much of the blame for the initial setbacks in Korea and the widespread reports of ill-equipped and inadequately trained U.S. military forces in the war's early stages.

As an initial response to the invasion, Truman called for a naval blockade of North Korea and was shocked to learn that such a blockade could be imposed only "on paper" since the U.S. Navy no longer had the warships with which to carry out his request. Army officials, desperate for weaponry, recovered Sherman tanks and other equipment from World War II Pacific battlefields and reconditioned them for shipment to Korea. Army Ordnance officials at Fort Knox pulled down M26 Pershing tanks from display pedestals around Fort Knox in order to equip the third company of the Army's hastily formed 70th Tank Battalion. Without adequate numbers of tactical fighter-bomber aircraft, the Air Force took F-51 (P-51) propeller-driven aircraft out of storage or from existing Air National Guard squadrons, and rushed them into front-line service. A shortage of spare parts and qualified maintenance personnel resulted in improvised repairs and overhauls. A Navy helicopter pilot aboard an active duty warship recalled fixing damaged rotor blades with masking tape in the absence of spares.

U.S. Army Reserve and Army National Guard infantry soldiers and new inductees (called to duty to fill out understrength infantry divisions) found themselves short of nearly everything needed to repel the North Korean forces: artillery, ammunition, heavy tanks, ground-support aircraft, even effective anti-tank weapons such as the M20 3.5-inch (89 mm) "Super Bazooka". Some Army combat units sent to Korea were supplied with worn-out, "red-lined" M1 rifles or carbines in immediate need of ordnance depot overhaul or repair. Only the Marine Corps, whose commanders had stored and maintained their World War II surplus inventories of equipment and weapons, proved ready for deployment, though they still were woefully understrength, as well as in need of suitable landing craft to practice amphibious operations (Secretary of Defense Louis Johnson had transferred most of the remaining craft to the Navy and reserved them for use in training Army units).

Due to public criticism of his handling of the Korean War, Truman decided to ask for Johnson's resignation. On 19 September 1950, Johnson resigned as Secretary of Defense, and the president quickly replaced him with General George C. Marshall.

Armored warfare
The initial assault by KPA forces was aided by the use of Soviet T-34-85 tanks. A KPA tank corps equipped with about 120 T-34s spearheaded the invasion. These faced an ROK that had few anti-tank weapons adequate to deal with the T-34s. Additional Soviet armor was added as the offensive progressed. The KPA tanks had a good deal of early successes against ROK infantry, Task Force Smith, and the U.S. M24 Chaffee light tanks that they encountered. Interdiction by ground attack aircraft was the only means of slowing the advancing KPA armor. The tide turned in favor of the UN forces in August 1950 when the KPA suffered major tank losses during a series of battles in which the UN forces brought heavier equipment to bear, including M4A3 Sherman and M26 medium tanks, as well as the British Centurion, Churchill and Cromwell tanks.

The Incheon landings on 15 September cut off the KPA supply lines, causing their armored forces and infantry to run out of fuel, ammunition, and other supplies. As a result of this and the Pusan perimeter breakout, the KPA had to retreat, and many of the T-34s and heavy weapons had to be abandoned. By the time the KPA withdrew from the South, a total of 239 T-34s and 74 SU-76 self-propelled guns were lost. After November 1950, KPA armor was rarely encountered.

Following the initial assault by the North, the Korean War saw limited use of tanks and featured no large-scale tank battles. The mountainous, forested terrain, especially in the eastern central zone, was poor tank country, limiting their mobility. Through the last two years of the war in Korea, UN tanks served largely as infantry support and mobile artillery pieces.

Naval warfare

Because neither Korea had a significant navy, the war featured few naval battles. A skirmish between North Korea and the UN Command occurred on 2 July 1950; the U.S. Navy cruiser , the Royal Navy cruiser  and the Royal Navy frigate  fought four North Korean torpedo boats and two mortar gunboats, and sank them.
USS Juneau later sank several ammunition ships that had been present. The last sea battle of the Korean War occurred days before the Battle of Incheon; the ROK ship PC-703 sank a North Korean minelayer in the Battle of Haeju Island, near Incheon. Three other supply ships were sunk by PC-703 two days later in the Yellow Sea. Thereafter, vessels from the UN nations held undisputed control of the sea about Korea. The gunships were used in shore bombardment, while the aircraft carriers provided air support to the ground forces.

During most of the war, the UN navies patrolled the west and east coasts of North Korea, sinking supply and ammunition ships and denying the North Koreans the ability to resupply from the sea. Aside from very occasional gunfire from North Korean shore batteries, the main threat to UN navy ships was from magnetic mines. During the war, five U.S. Navy ships were lost to mines: two minesweepers, two minesweeper escorts, and one ocean tug. Mines and gunfire from North Korean coastal artillery damaged another 87 U.S. warships, resulting in slight to moderate damage.

Aerial warfare

The war was the first in which jet aircraft played the central role in air combat. Once-formidable fighters such as the P-51 Mustang, F4U Corsair, and Hawker Sea Fury—all piston-engined, propeller-driven, and designed during World War II—relinquished their air-superiority roles to a new generation of faster, jet-powered fighters arriving in the theater. For the initial months of the war, the P-80 Shooting Star, F9F Panther, Gloster Meteor and other jets under the UN flag dominated the Korean People's Air Force (KPAF) propeller-driven Soviet Yakovlev Yak-9 and Lavochkin La-9s. By early August 1950, the KPAF was reduced to only about 20 planes.

The Chinese intervention in late October 1950 bolstered the KPAF with the MiG-15, one of the world's most advanced jet fighters. The heavily armed MiGs were faster than first-generation UN jets and therefore could reach and destroy U.S. B-29 Superfortress bomber flights despite their fighter escorts. With increasing B-29 losses, the USAF was forced to switch from a daylight bombing campaign to the safer but less accurate nighttime bombing of targets.

The USAF countered the MiG-15 by sending over three squadrons of its most capable fighter, the F-86 Sabre. These arrived in December 1950. The MiG was designed as a bomber interceptor. It had a very high service ceiling— and carried very heavy weaponry: one 37 mm cannon and two 23 mm cannons. If coming in at higher altitude, the advantage of choosing to engage went to the MiG. The MiG climbed faster, but the Sabre turned and dived better.

In the summer and autumn of 1951, the outnumbered Sabres of the USAF's 4th Fighter Interceptor Wing—only 44 at one point—continued seeking battle in MiG Alley, where the Yalu River marks the Chinese border, against Chinese and North Korean air forces capable of deploying some 500 aircraft. Following Colonel Harrison Thyng's communication with the Pentagon, the 51st Fighter-Interceptor Wing finally reinforced the beleaguered 4th Wing in December 1951; for the next year-and-a-half stretch of the war, aerial warfare continued.

Unlike the Vietnam War, in which the Soviet Union only officially sent "advisers", the 64th Fighter Aviation Corps saw action in the Korean air war. Fearful of confronting the U.S. directly, the Soviet Union denied the involvement of their personnel in anything other than an advisory role, but air combat quickly resulted in Soviet pilots dropping their code signals and speaking over the wireless in Russian. This known direct Soviet participation was a casus belli that the UN Command deliberately overlooked, lest the war expand to include the Soviet Union, and potentially escalate into atomic warfare.

After the war, and to the present day, the USAF reports an inflated F-86 Sabre kill ratio in excess of 10:1, with 792 MiG-15s and 108 other aircraft shot down by Sabres, and 78 Sabres lost to enemy fire. The Soviet Air Force reported some 1,100 air-to-air victories and 335 MiG combat losses, while China's PLAAF reported 231 combat losses, mostly MiG-15s, and 168 other aircraft lost. The KPAF reported no data, but the UN Command estimates some 200 KPAF aircraft lost in the war's first stage, and 70 additional aircraft after the Chinese intervention. The USAF disputes Soviet and Chinese claims of 650 and 211 downed F-86s, respectively.

More modern estimates place the overall USAF kill ratio at around 1.8:1 with the ratio dropping to 1.3:1 against MiG-15s with Soviet pilots, but increasing to 
a dominant 12:1 against Chinese and North Korean adversaries.

According to reports by Lt. Gen. Sidor Slyusarev, commander of Soviet air forces in Korea, the 64th Corps claimed a total 1,097 enemy aircraft of all types during operations, for the loss of 335 aircraft (including lost to enemy ground fire, accidents, etc) and 110 pilots. This puts the overall kill ratio at 3.4:1 in favor of USSR pilots. Effectiveness of the Soviet fighters declined as the war progressed. While between November 1950 and January 1952, overall kill ratio was 7.9:1 in favor of the USSR, this declined to 2.2:1, during 1952 and 1.9:1 in 1953. This was due in part to more advanced jet fighters appearing on the UN side and improving U.S. tactics. 

Regardless of the actual ratio, American Sabres were very effective at controlling the skies over Korea; since no other UN fighter could contend with the MiG-15, F-86s largely took over air combat once they arrived, relegating other aircraft to performing air-to-ground duties. Despite being outnumbered (the number of Sabres in theater never exceeded 150 while MiG-15s reached 900 at their peak), North Korean and Chinese aircraft were seldom encountered south of Pyongyang. UN ground forces, supply lines, and infrastructure were not attacked from the air, and although North Korea had 75 airfields capable of supporting MiGs, after 1951, any serious effort to operate from them was abandoned, keeping them based across the Yalu River in the safety of China. This confined most air-to-air engagements to MiG Alley, giving UN aircraft free rein to conduct strike missions over enemy territory with little fear of interception. Although jet dogfights are remembered as a prominent part of the Korean War, counter-air missions comprised just 12% of Far East Air Forces sorties, and four times as many sorties were performed for close air support and interdiction.

The war marked a major milestone not only for fixed-wing aircraft, but also for rotorcraft, featuring the first large-scale deployment of helicopters for medical evacuation (medevac). In 1944–1945, during the Second World War, the YR-4 helicopter saw limited ambulance duty, but in Korea, where rough terrain trumped the jeep as a speedy medevac vehicle, helicopters like the Sikorsky H-19 helped reduce fatal casualties to a dramatic degree when combined with complementary medical innovations such as Mobile Army Surgical Hospitals. As such, the medical evacuation and care system for the wounded was so effective for the UN forces that a wounded soldier who arrived at a MASH unit alive typically had a 97% chance of survival. The limitations of jet aircraft for close air support highlighted the helicopter's potential in the role, leading to the development of the helicopter gunships used in the Vietnam War (1965–75).

Bombing of North Korea

The initial bombing attack on North Korea was approved on the fourth day of the war, 29 June 1950, by General Douglas MacArthur immediately upon request by the commanding general of the Far East Air Forces (FEAF), George E. Stratemeyer. Major bombing began in late July. U.S. airpower conducted 7,000 close support and interdiction airstrikes that month, which helped slow the North Korean rate of advance to  a day. On 12 August 1950, the USAF dropped 625 tons of bombs on North Korea; two weeks later, the daily tonnage increased to some 800 tons.

From June through October, official U.S. policy was to pursue precision bombing aimed at communication centers (railroad stations, marshaling yards, main yards, and railways) and industrial facilities deemed vital to war-making capacity. The policy was the result of debates after World War II, in which U.S. policy rejected the mass civilian bombings that had been conducted in the later stages of World War II as unproductive and immoral. In early July, General Emmett O'Donnell Jr. requested permission to firebomb five North Korean cities. He proposed that MacArthur announce that the UN would employ the firebombing methods that "brought Japan to its knees". The announcement would warn the leaders of North Korea "to get women and children and other noncombatants the hell out".

According to O'Donnell, MacArthur responded, "No, Rosie, I'm not prepared to go that far yet. My instructions are very explicit; however, I want you to know that I have no compunction whatever to your bombing bona fide military objectives, with high explosives, in those five industrial centers. If you miss your target and kill people or destroy other parts of the city, I accept that as a part of war."

In September 1950, MacArthur said in his public report to the UN, "The problem of avoiding the killing of innocent civilians and damages to the civilian economy is continually present and given my personal attention."

In October 1950, FEAF commander General Stratemeyer requested permission to attack the city of Sinuiju, a provincial capital with an estimated population of 60,000, "over the widest area of the city, without warning, by burning and high explosive". MacArthur's headquarters responded the following day: "The general policy enunciated from Washington negates such an attack unless the military situation clearly requires it. Under present circumstances this is not the case."

Following the intervention of the Chinese in November, General MacArthur ordered increased bombing on North Korea, which included firebombing against the country's arsenals and communications centers and especially against the "Korean end" of all the bridges across the Yalu River. As with the aerial bombing campaigns over Germany and Japan in World War II, the nominal objective of the USAF was to destroy North Korea's war infrastructure and shatter the country's morale.

On 3 November 1950, General Stratemeyer forwarded to MacArthur the request of Fifth Air Force commander General Earle E. Partridge for clearance to "burn Sinuiju". As he had done previously in July and October, MacArthur denied the request, explaining that he planned to use the town's facilities after seizing it. However, at the same meeting, MacArthur agreed for the first time to a firebombing campaign, agreeing to Stratemeyer's request to burn the city of Kanggye and several other towns: "Burn it if you so desire. Not only that, Strat, but burn and destroy as a lesson to any other of those towns that you consider of military value to the enemy." The same evening, MacArthur's chief of staff told Stratemeyer that the firebombing of Sinuiju had also been approved. In his diary, Stratemeyer summarized the instructions as follows: "Every installation, facility, and village in North Korea now becomes a military and tactical target." Stratemeyer sent orders to the Fifth Air Force and Bomber Command to "destroy every means of communications and every installation, factory, city, and village".

On 5 November 1950, General Stratemeyer gave the following order to the commanding general of the Fifth Air Force: "Aircraft under Fifth Air Force control will destroy all other targets including all buildings capable of affording shelter." The same day, twenty-two B-29s attacked Kanggye, destroying 75% of the city.

After MacArthur was removed as UN Supreme Commander in Korea in April 1951, his successors continued this policy and ultimately extended it to all of North Korea. The U.S. dropped a total of 635,000 tons of bombs, including 32,557 tons of napalm, on Korea, more than during the whole Pacific campaign of World War II. North Korea ranks alongside Cambodia (500,000 tons), Laos (2 million tons) and South Vietnam (4 million tons) as among the most heavily bombed countries in history, with Laos suffering the most extensive bombardment relative to its size and population.

Almost every substantial building in North Korea was destroyed as a result. The war's highest-ranking U.S. POW, Major General William F. Dean, reported that the majority of North Korean cities and villages he saw were either rubble or snow-covered wasteland. North Korean factories, schools, hospitals, and government offices were forced to move underground, and air defenses were "non-existent". In November 1950, the North Korean leadership instructed their population to build dugouts and mud huts and to dig tunnels to solve the acute housing problem. U.S. Air Force General Curtis LeMay commented: "We went over there and fought the war and eventually burned down every town in North Korea anyway, some way or another, and some in South Korea, too." U.S. Colonel Dean Rusk, later secretary of state, stated the U.S. bombed "everything that moved in North Korea, every brick standing on top of another." Pyongyang, which saw 75 percent of its area destroyed, was so devastated that bombing was halted as there were no longer any worthy targets left. On 28 November, Bomber Command reported on the campaign's progress: 95 percent of Manpojin was destroyed, along with 90 percent of Hoeryong, Namsi and Koindong, 85 percent of Chosan, 75 percent of both Sakchu and Huichon and 20 percent of Uiju. According to USAF damage assessments, "Eighteen of twenty-two major cities in North Korea had been at least half obliterated." By the end of the campaign, U.S. bombers had difficulty in finding targets and were reduced to bombing footbridges or jettisoning their bombs into the sea.

In May 1953, five major North Korean dams were bombed. According to Charles K. Armstrong, the bombing of these dams and ensuing floods threatened several million North Koreans with starvation, although large-scale famine was averted with emergency aid provided by North Korea's allies.

General Matthew Ridgway said that except for air power, "the war would have been over in 60 days with all Korea in Communist hands". UN air forces flew 1,040,708 combat and combat support sorties during the war. FEAF flew the majority at 710,886 (69.3% of sorties), with the U.S. Navy performing 16.1%, the U.S. Marine Corps 10.3%, and 4.3% by other allied air forces.

As well as conventional bombing, the Communist side claimed that the U.S. used biological weapons. These claims have been disputed; Conrad Crane asserts that while the U.S. worked towards developing chemical and biological weapons, the U.S. military "possessed neither the ability, nor the will", to use them in combat.

U.S. threat of atomic warfare

On 5 November 1950, the U.S. Joint Chiefs of Staff issued orders for the retaliatory atomic bombing of Manchurian PRC military bases, if either of their armies crossed into Korea or if PRC or KPA bombers attacked Korea from there. President Truman ordered the transfer of nine Mark 4 nuclear bombs "to the Air Force's Ninth Bomb Group, the designated carrier of the weapons ... [and] signed an order to use them against Chinese and Korean targets", which he never transmitted.

Many U.S. officials viewed the deployment of nuclear-capable (but not nuclear-armed) B-29 bombers to Britain as helping to resolve the Berlin Blockade of 1948–1949. Truman and Eisenhower both had military experience and viewed nuclear weapons as potentially usable components of their military. During Truman's first meeting to discuss the war on 25 June 1950, he ordered plans be prepared for attacking Soviet forces if they entered the war. By July, Truman approved another B-29 deployment to Britain, this time with bombs (but without their cores), to remind the Soviets of U.S. offensive ability. Deployment of a similar fleet to Guam was leaked to The New York Times. As UN forces retreated to Pusan, and the CIA reported that mainland China was building up forces for a possible invasion of Taiwan, the Pentagon believed that Congress and the public would demand using nuclear weapons if the situation in Korea required them.

As PVA forces pushed back the UN forces from the Yalu River, Truman stated during a 30 November 1950 press conference that using nuclear weapons was "always [under] active consideration", with control under the local military commander. The Indian ambassador, K. Madhava Panikkar, reports "that Truman announced he was thinking of using the atom bomb in Korea. But the Chinese seemed unmoved by this threat ... The PRC's propaganda against the U.S. was stepped up. The 'Aid Korea to resist America' campaign was made the slogan for increased production, greater national integration, and more rigid control over anti-national activities. One could not help feeling that Truman's threat came in useful to the leaders of the Revolution, to enable them to keep up the tempo of their activities."

After his statement caused concern in Europe, Truman met on 4 December 1950 with UK prime minister and Commonwealth spokesman Clement Attlee, French Premier René Pleven, and French Foreign Minister Robert Schuman to discuss their worries about atomic warfare and its likely continental expansion. The U.S.' forgoing atomic warfare was not because of "a disinclination by the Soviet Union and People's Republic of China to escalate [the Korean War]", but because UN allies—notably the UK, the Commonwealth, and France—were concerned about a geopolitical imbalance rendering NATO defenseless while the U.S. fought China, who then might persuade the Soviet Union to conquer Western Europe. The Joint Chiefs of Staff advised Truman to tell Attlee that the U.S. would use nuclear weapons only if necessary to protect an evacuation of UN troops, or to prevent a "major military disaster".

On 6 December 1950, after the Chinese intervention repelled the UN armies from northern North Korea, General J. Lawton Collins (Army Chief of Staff), General MacArthur, Admiral C. Turner Joy, General George E. Stratemeyer and staff officers Major General Doyle Hickey, Major General Charles A. Willoughby and Major General Edwin K. Wright met in Tokyo to plan strategy countering the Chinese intervention; they considered three potential atomic warfare scenarios encompassing the next weeks and months of warfare.
 In the first scenario: If the PVA continued attacking in full and the UN Command was forbidden to blockade and bomb China, and without Taiwanese reinforcements, and without an increase in U.S. forces until April 1951 (four National Guard divisions were due to arrive), then atomic bombs might be used in North Korea.
 In the second scenario: If the PVA continued full attacks and the UN Command blockaded China and had effective aerial reconnaissance and bombing of the Chinese interior, and the Taiwanese soldiers were maximally exploited, and tactical atomic bombing was to hand, then the UN forces could hold positions deep in North Korea.
 In the third scenario: if China agreed not to cross the 38th Parallel border, General MacArthur recommended UN acceptance of an armistice disallowing PVA and KPA troops south of the parallel, and requiring PVA and KPA guerrillas to withdraw northwards. The U.S. Eighth Army would remain to protect the Seoul–Incheon area, while X Corps would retreat to Pusan. A UN commission should supervise implementation of the armistice.

Both the Pentagon and the State Department were cautious about using nuclear weapons because of the risk of general war with China and the diplomatic ramifications. Truman and his senior advisors agreed, and never seriously considered using them in early December 1950 despite the poor military situation in Korea.

In 1951, the U.S. escalated closest to atomic warfare in Korea. Because China deployed new armies to the Sino-Korean frontier, ground crews at the Kadena Air Base, Okinawa, assembled atomic bombs for Korean warfare, "lacking only the essential pit nuclear cores". In October 1951, the United States effected Operation Hudson Harbor to establish a nuclear weapons capability. USAF B-29 bombers practiced individual bombing runs from Okinawa to North Korea (using dummy nuclear or conventional bombs), coordinated from Yokota Air Base in east-central Japan. Hudson Harbor tested "actual functioning of all activities which would be involved in an atomic strike, including weapons assembly and testing, leading, [and] ground control of bomb aiming". The bombing run data indicated that atomic bombs would be tactically ineffective against massed infantry, because the "timely identification of large masses of enemy troops was extremely rare".

General Matthew Ridgway was authorized to use nuclear weapons if a major air attack originated from outside Korea. An envoy was sent to Hong Kong to deliver a warning to China. The message likely caused Chinese leaders to be more cautious about potential U.S. use of nuclear weapons, but whether they learned about the B-29 deployment is unclear, and the failure of the two major Chinese offensives that month likely was what caused them to shift to a defensive strategy in Korea. The B-29s returned to the United States in June.

Despite the greater destructive power that atomic weapons would bring to the war, their effects on determining the war's outcome would have likely been minimal. Tactically, given the dispersed nature of PVA/KPA forces, the relatively primitive infrastructure for staging and logistics centers, and the small number of bombs available (most would have been conserved for use against the Soviets), atomic attacks would have limited effects against the ability of China to mobilize and move forces. Strategically, attacking Chinese cities to destroy civilian industry and infrastructure would cause the immediate dispersion of the leadership away from such areas and give propaganda value for the Communists to galvanize the support of Chinese civilians. Since the Soviets were not expected to intervene with their few primitive atomic weapons on China or North Korea's behalf, the threat of a possible nuclear exchange was unimportant in the decision not to deploy atomic bombs; their use offered little operational advantage, and would undesirably lower the "threshold" for using atomic weapons against non-nuclear states in future conflicts.

When Eisenhower succeeded Truman in early 1953, he was similarly cautious about using nuclear weapons in Korea. The administration prepared contingency plans to use them against China, but like Truman, the new president feared that doing so would result in Soviet attacks on Japan. The war ended as it began, without U.S. nuclear weapons deployed near battle.

War crimes

Civilian deaths and massacres

There were numerous atrocities and massacres of civilians throughout the Korean War committed by both sides, starting in the war's first days. On 28 June 1950, North Korean troops committed the Seoul National University Hospital massacre. On the same day, South Korean President Syngman Rhee ordered the Bodo League massacre, beginning mass killings of suspected leftist sympathizers and their families by South Korean officials and right-wing groups. Estimates of those killed during the Bodo League massacre range from at least 60,000–110,000 (Kim Dong-choon) to 200,000 (Park Myung-lim). The British protested to their allies about later South Korean mass executions, and saved some citizens.

In 2005–2010, a South Korean Truth and Reconciliation Commission investigated atrocities and other human rights violations through much of the 20th century, from the Japanese colonial period through the Korean War and beyond. It excavated some mass graves from the Bodo League massacres and confirmed the general outlines of those political executions. Of the Korean War-era massacres the commission was petitioned to investigate, 82% were perpetrated by South Korean forces, with 18% perpetrated by North Korean forces.

The commission also received petitions alleging more than 200 large-scale killings of South Korean civilians by the U.S. military during the war, mostly air attacks. It confirmed several such cases, including refugees crowded into a cave attacked with napalm bombs, which survivors said killed 360 people, and an air attack that killed 197 refugees gathered in a field in the far south. It recommended South Korea seek reparations from the United States, but in 2010, a reorganized commission under a new, conservative government concluded that most U.S. mass killings resulted from "military necessity", while in a small number of cases, they concluded, the U.S. military had acted with "low levels of unlawfulness", but the commission recommended against seeking reparations.

In the most notorious U.S. massacre, investigated separately, not by the commission, American troops killed an estimated 250–300 refugees, mostly women and children, at No Gun Ri in central South Korea (26–29 July 1950). U.S. commanders, fearing enemy infiltrators among refugee columns, had adopted a policy of stopping civilian groups approaching U.S. lines, including by gunfire. After years of rejecting survivors' accounts, the U.S. Army investigated and in 2001 acknowledged the No Gun Ri killings, but claimed they were not ordered and "not a deliberate killing". South Korean officials, after a parallel investigation, said they believed there were orders to shoot. The survivors' representatives denounced what they described as a U.S. "whitewash".

The U.S. bombing of North Korea has been condemned as a war crime by some authors, because it often included bombing civilian targets and caused many civilians casualties. According to Bruce Cumings, "What hardly any Americans know or remember is that we carpet-bombed the north for three years with next to no concern for civilian casualties.” Author Blaine Harden has called the bombing campaign a "major war crime" and described it as "long, leisurely and merciless”. He says it's "perhaps the most forgotten part of a forgotten war".

Prisoners of War (POWs)

Chinese POWs
At Geoje prison camp on Geoje Island, Chinese POWs experienced anti-Communist lecturing and missionary work from secret agents from the U.S. and Taiwan in No. 71, 72 and 86 camps. Pro-Communist POWs experienced torture, cutting off of limbs, or were executed in public. Being forced to write confession letters and receiving tattoos of an anti-Communism slogan and Flag of the Republic of China were also commonly seen, in case any wanted to go back to mainland China.

Pro-Communist POWs who could not endure the torture formed an underground group to fight the pro-Nationalist POWs secretly by assassination, which led to the Geoje uprising. The rebellion captured Francis Dodd, and was suppressed by the 187th Infantry Regiment.

In the end, 14,235 Chinese POWs went to Taiwan and fewer than 6,000 POWs returned to mainland China. Those who went to Taiwan are called "righteous men" and experienced brainwashing again and were sent to the army or were arrested; while the survivors who returned to mainland China were welcomed as a "hero" first, but experienced anti-brainwashing, strict interrogation, and house arrest eventually, after the tattoos were discovered. After 1988, the Taiwanese government allowed POWs to go back to mainland China, and helped remove anti-Communist tattoos; while the mainland Chinese government started to allow mainland Chinese prisoners of war to return from Taiwan.

UN Command POWs
The United States reported that North Korea mistreated prisoners of war: soldiers were beaten, starved, put to forced labor, marched to death, and summarily executed.

The KPA killed POWs at the battles for Hill 312, Hill 303, the Pusan Perimeter, Daejeon and Sunchon; these massacres were discovered afterwards by the UN forces. Later, a U.S. Congress war crimes investigation, the United States Senate Subcommittee on Korean War Atrocities of the Permanent Subcommittee of the Investigations of the Committee on Government Operations, reported that "two-thirds of all American prisoners of war in Korea died as a result of war crimes".

Although the Chinese rarely executed prisoners like their North Korean counterparts, mass starvation and diseases swept through the Chinese-run POW camps during the winter of 1950–51. About 43 percent of U.S. POWs died during this period. The Chinese defended their actions by stating that all Chinese soldiers during this period were suffering mass starvation and diseases due to logistical difficulties. The UN POWs said that most of the Chinese camps were located near the easily supplied Sino-Korean border and that the Chinese withheld food to force the prisoners to accept the communism indoctrination programs. According to Chinese reports, over a thousand U.S. POWs died by the end of June 1951, while a dozen British POWs died, and all Turkish POWs survived. According to Hastings, wounded U.S. POWs died for lack of medical attention and were fed a diet of corn and millet "devoid of vegetables, almost barren of proteins, minerals, or vitamins" with only 1/3 the calories of their usual diet. Especially in early 1951, thousands of prisoners lost the will to live and "declined to eat the mess of sorghum and rice they were provided".

The unpreparedness of U.S. POWs to resist heavy Communist indoctrination during the Korean War led to the Code of the United States Fighting Force which governs how U.S. military personnel in combat should act when they must "evade capture, resist while a prisoner or escape from the enemy".

North Korea may have detained up to 50,000 South Korean POWs after the ceasefire. Over 88,000 South Korean soldiers were missing and the KPA claimed they captured 70,000 South Koreans. However, when ceasefire negotiations began in 1951, the KPA reported they held only 8,000 South Koreans. The UN Command protested the discrepancies and alleged that the KPA were forcing South Korean POWs to join the KPA.

The KPA denied such allegations. They claimed their POW rosters were small because many POWs were killed in UN air raids and that they had released ROK soldiers at the front. They insisted only volunteers were allowed to serve in the KPA. By early 1952, UN negotiators gave up trying to get back the missing South Koreans. The POW exchange proceeded without access to South Korean POWs who were not on the PVA/KPA rosters.

North Korea continued to claim that any South Korean POW who stayed in the North did so voluntarily. However, since 1994, South Korean POWs have been escaping North Korea on their own after decades of captivity. , the South Korean Ministry of Unification reported that 79 ROK POWs escaped the North. The South Korean government estimates 500 South Korean POWs continue to be detained in North Korea.

The escaped POWs have testified about their treatment and written memoirs about their lives in North Korea. They report they were not told about the POW exchange procedures, and were assigned to work in mines in the remote northeastern regions near the Chinese and Russian border. Declassified Soviet Foreign Ministry documents corroborate such testimony.

In 1997, the Geoje POW Camp in South Korea was turned into a memorial.

Starvation

In December 1950, the South Korean National Defense Corps was founded; the soldiers were 406,000 drafted citizens.
In the winter of 1951, 50,000 to 90,000 South Korean National Defense Corps soldiers starved to death while marching southward under the PVA offensive when their commanding officers embezzled funds earmarked for their food. This event is called the National Defense Corps Incident. Although his political allies certainly profited from corruption, it remains controversial if Syngman Rhee was personally involved in or benefited from the corruption.

Recreation

In 1950, Secretary of Defense George C. Marshall and Secretary of the Navy Francis P. Matthews called on the United Service Organizations (USO) which was disbanded by 1947 to provide support for U.S. servicemen. By the end of the war, more than 113,000 USO volunteers from the U.S. were working at the home front and abroad. Many stars came to Korea to give their performances. Throughout the Korean War, comfort stations (brothels) were operated by South Korean officials for UN soldiers despite prostitution being ostensibly illegal.

Aftermath

Postwar recovery was different in the two Koreas. South Korea, which started from a far lower industrial base than North Korea (the latter contained 80% of Korea's heavy industry in 1945), stagnated in the first postwar decade. In 1953, South Korea and the United States signed a Mutual Defense Treaty. In 1960, the April Revolution occurred and students joined an anti-Syngman Rhee demonstration; 142 were killed by police; in consequence, Syngman Rhee resigned and left for exile in the United States. Park Chung-hee's May 16 coup enabled social stability. From 1965 to 1973, South Korea dispatched troops to South Vietnam and received $235,560,000 in allowance and military procurement from the United States. GNP increased fivefold during the Vietnam War. South Korea industrialized and modernized. South Korea had one of the world's fastest-growing economies from the early 1960s to the late 1990s. In 1957, South Korea had a lower per capita GDP than Ghana, and by 2010, it was a developed country and ranked thirteenth in the world (Ghana was 86th).

As a result of the war, "North Korea had been virtually destroyed as an industrial society". After the armistice, Kim Il-Sung requested Soviet economic and industrial assistance. In September 1953, the Soviet government agreed to "cancel or postpone repayment for all ... outstanding debts", and promised to grant North Korea one billion rubles in monetary aid, industrial equipment and consumer goods. Eastern European members of the Soviet Bloc also contributed with "logistical support, technical aid, [and] medical supplies". China canceled North Korea's war debts, provided 800 million yuan, promised trade cooperation and sent in thousands of troops to rebuild damaged infrastructure. Contemporary North Korea remains underdeveloped.

North Korea has continued to be a totalitarian dictatorship since the end of the war, with an elaborate cult of personality around the Kim dynasty.

The means of production are owned by the state through state-run enterprises and collectivized farms. Most services—such as healthcare, education, housing and food production—are subsidized or state-funded. Estimates based on the most recent North Korean census suggest that 240,000 to 420,000 people died as a result of the 1990s North Korean famine and that there were 600,000 to 850,000 unnatural deaths in North Korea from 1993 to 2008. A study by South Korean anthropologists of North Korean children who had defected to China found that 18-year-old males were  shorter than South Koreans their age because of malnutrition.

Present-day North Korea follows Songun, or "military-first" policy. North Korea possesses nuclear weapons. A 2014 UN inquiry into abuses of human rights in North Korea concluded that, "the gravity, scale and nature of these violations reveal a state that does not have any parallel in the contemporary world," with Amnesty International and Human Rights Watch holding similar views.

South Korean anti-Americanism after the war was fueled by the presence and behavior of U.S. military personnel (USFK) and U.S. support for Park's authoritarian regime, a fact still evident during the country's democratic transition in the 1980s. However, anti-Americanism has declined significantly in South Korea in recent years, from 46% favorable in 2003 to 74% favorable in 2011, making South Korea one of the most pro-U.S. countries in the world.

A large number of mixed-race "GI babies" (offspring of U.S. and other UN soldiers and Korean women) were filling up the country's orphanages. Because Korean traditional society places significant weight on paternal family ties, bloodlines, and purity of race, children of mixed race or those without fathers are not easily accepted in South Korean society. International adoption of Korean children began in 1954. The U.S. Immigration Act of 1952 legalized the naturalization of non-Blacks and non-Whites as U.S. citizens and made possible the entry of military spouses and children from South Korea after the Korean War. With the passage of the Immigration Act of 1965, which substantially changed U.S. immigration policy toward non-Europeans, Koreans became one of the fastest-growing Asian groups in the United States.

Mao Zedong's decision to take on the United States in the Korean War was a direct attempt to confront what the Communist bloc viewed as the strongest anti-Communist power in the world, undertaken at a time when the Chinese Communist regime was still consolidating its own power after winning the Chinese Civil War. Mao supported intervention not to save North Korea, but because he believed that a military conflict with the U.S. was inevitable after the U.S. entered the war, and to appease the Soviet Union to secure military dispensation and achieve Mao's goal of making China a major world military power. Mao was equally ambitious in improving his own prestige inside the communist international community by demonstrating that his Marxist concerns were international. In his later years, Mao believed that Stalin only gained a positive opinion of him after China's entrance into the Korean War. Inside mainland China, the war improved the long-term prestige of Mao, Zhou, and Peng, allowing the Chinese Communist Party to increase its legitimacy while weakening anti-Communist dissent.

The Chinese government has encouraged the viewpoint that the war was initiated by the United States and South Korea, though ComIntern documents have shown that Mao sought approval from Joseph Stalin to enter the war. In Chinese media, the Chinese war effort is considered as an example of China's engaging the strongest power in the world with an underequipped army, forcing it to retreat, and fighting it to a military stalemate. These successes were contrasted with China's historical humiliations by Japan and by Western powers over the previous hundred years, highlighting the abilities of the PLA and the Chinese Communist Party. The most significant negative long-term consequence of the war for China was that it led the United States to guarantee the safety of Chiang Kai-shek's regime in Taiwan, effectively ensuring that Taiwan would remain outside of PRC control through the present day. Mao had also discovered the usefulness of large-scale mass movements in the war while implementing them among most of his ruling measures over PRC. Finally, anti-U.S. sentiments, which were already a significant factor during the Chinese Civil War, were ingrained into Chinese culture during the Communist propaganda campaigns of the Korean War.

The Korean War affected other participant combatants. Turkey, for example, entered NATO in 1952, and the foundation was laid for bilateral diplomatic and trade relations with South Korea.

See also

 1st Commonwealth Division
 Australia in the Korean War
 Canada in the Korean War
 Colombian Battalion
 Joint Advisory Commission, Korea
 Korean DMZ Conflict (1966–1969)
 Korean reunification
 Korean War in popular culture
 List of books about the Korean War
 List of Korean War Medal of Honor recipients
 List of Korean War weapons
 List of military equipment used in the Korean War
 List of wars and anthropogenic disasters by death toll
 MASH – film
 M*A*S*H – TV series
 New Zealand in the Korean War
 North Korea in the Korean War
 Operation Big Switch
 Operation Little Switch
 Operation Moolah
 Partisans in the Korean War
 Philippine Expeditionary Forces to Korea
 Pyongyang Sally
 Soviet Union in the Korean War
 Transfer of People's Volunteer Army soldiers' remains from South Korea to China
 UNCMAC – the UN Command Military Armistice Commission operating from 1953 to the present
 UNCURK – the 1951 UN Commission for the Unification and Rehabilitation of Korea
 UNTCOK – the 1950 United Nations Temporary Commission on Korea
 United States in the Korean War

War memorials
 Korean War Memorial Wall, Brampton, Ontario
 Korean War Veterans Memorial, Washington, D.C.
 Memorial of the War to Resist U.S. Aggression and Aid Korea, Dandong, Liaoning, China
 National War Memorial (New Zealand)
 Philadelphia Korean War Memorial
 United Nations Memorial Cemetery, Busan, Republic of Korea
 Victorious War Museum, Pyongyang, North Korea
 War Memorial of Korea Yongsan-dong, Yongsan-gu, Seoul, South Korea

Notes

References

Citations

Bibliography

 
 
 

 
 
 
 
 
 
 
 
 
 
 
 
 
 Hermes, Walter G. Truce Tent and Fighting Front. [Multiple editions]:

  Appendix B-2 
 
 
 Lee, Steven. "The Korean War in History and Historiography." Journal of American-East Asian Relations 21#2 (2014): 185–206. doi:10.1163/18765610-02102010.
 Lin, L., et al. "Whose history? An analysis of the Korean war in history textbooks from the United States, South Korea, Japan, and China". Social Studies 100.5 (2009): 222–232. online
 
 Matray, James I., and Donald W. Boose Jr, eds. The Ashgate research companion to the Korean War (2014) excerpt; covers historiography
 Matray, James I. "Conflicts in Korea" in Daniel S. Margolies, ed. A Companion to Harry S. Truman (2012) pp 498–531; emphasis on historiography.

External links

 Records of the United Nations Commission for the Unification and Rehabilitation of Korea (UNCURK) (1950–1973) at the United Nations Archives

Historical
 Anniversary of the Korean War Armistice: Truman on Acheson's Crucial Role in Going to War  Shapell Manuscript Foundation
 Korean War resources, Dwight D. Eisenhower Presidential Library 
 North Korea International Documentation Project
 Grand Valley State University Veteran's History Project digital collection
 The Forgotten War, Remembered – four testimonials in The New York Times
 Collection of Books and Research Materials on the Korean War  an online collection of the United States Army Center of Military History
 Korean War, US Army Signal Corps Photograph Collection U.S. Army Heritage and Education Center, Carlisle, Pennsylvania
 The Korean War at History.com
 Koreanwar-educator.org

Media
 West Point Atlas of the Korean War
 The Korean War You Never Knew – slideshows by Life magazine
 U.S. Army Korea Media Center official Korean War online image archive
 Rare pictures of the Korean War from the U.S. Library of Congress and National Archives
 Land of the Morning Calm Canadians in Korea – multimedia project including veteran interviews
 Pathé  Online newsreel archive featuring films on the war
 CBC Digital Archives – Forgotten Heroes: Canada and the Korean War
 Uncertain Enemies: Soviet Pilots in the Korean War. Air Power History. (Spring 1997). 44, 1, 32–45.

Organizations
 Korea Defense Veterans of America
 Korean War Ex-POW Association
 Korean War Veterans Association
 The Center for the Study of the Korean War

Memorials
 Korean Children's War Memorial
 Chinese 50th Anniversary Korean War Memorial

 
Revolution-based civil wars
Civil wars involving the states and peoples of Asia
History of Korea
Korea
Wars involving Australia
Wars involving Canada
Wars involving Belgium
Wars involving the People's Republic of China
Wars involving Ethiopia
Wars involving France
Wars involving Greece
Wars involving Luxembourg
Wars involving New Zealand
Wars involving South Africa
Wars involving Thailand
Wars involving Turkey
Wars involving the Netherlands
Wars involving the Philippines
Wars involving the Soviet Union
Wars involving the United Kingdom
Wars involving the United States
Conflicts in 1950
Conflicts in 1951
Conflicts in 1952
Conflicts in 1953
Civil wars post-1945
Communism-based civil wars
Anti-South Korean sentiment in North Korea
Anti-North Korean sentiment in South Korea
Aftermath of World War II
Wars involving North Korea
Wars involving South Korea
1950s in North Korea
1950s in South Korea
Proxy wars
Wars involving Korea